= List of Longitarsus species =

This is a partial list of species in Longitarsus, a genus of flea beetles in the family Chrysomelidae.

== Selected species ==
- Longitarsus absynthii Kutschera, 1862^{g}
- Longitarsus acutipennis Blatchley, 1924^{i c g}
- Longitarsus aeneicollis (Faldermann, 1837)^{g}
- Longitarsus aeneolus Blatchley, 1923^{i c g}
- Longitarsus aeneus (Kutschera, 1862)^{g}
- Longitarsus aeruginosus (Foudras, 1860)
- Longitarsus agilis (Rye, 1868)^{g}
- Longitarsus albineus (Foudras, 1859)
- Longitarsus albus (Allard, 1866)^{g}
- Longitarsus alfierii Pic, 1923^{g}
- Longitarsus allotrophus
- Longitarsus alternatus (Ziegler, 1845)^{i c g}
- Longitarsus anacardius (Allard, 1866)^{g}
- Longitarsus anatolicus
- Longitarsus anchusae (Paykull, 1799)^{g}
- Longitarsus andalusicus Gruev, 1973^{g}
- Longitarsus angelikae
- Longitarsus angorensis
- Longitarsus apicalis (Beck, 1817)^{g}
- Longitarsus aramaicus Leonardi, 1979^{g}
- Longitarsus arenaceus Blatchley, 1921^{i c g b}
- Longitarsus arisanus Chujo, 1937^{g}
- Longitarsus artvinus Gruev & Aslan, 1998
- Longitarsus atricillus (Linnaeus, 1761)^{g}
- Longitarsus aubozaorum
- Longitarsus audisioi
- Longitarsus australis (Mulsant & Rey, 1874)
- Longitarsus baeticus Leonardi, 1979^{g}
- Longitarsus ballotae (Marsham, 1802)^{g}
- Longitarsus barbarae Doguet & Bergeal, 2001^{g}
- Longitarsus bedeli Uhagon, 1887^{g}
- Longitarsus behnei Gruev & Arnold, 1989^{g}
- Longitarsus belgaumensis Jacoby
- Longitarsus bergeali Doguet & Gruev, 1988
- Longitarsus bertii Leonardi, 1973^{g}
- Longitarsus bethae ^{g}
- Longitarsus bicolor Horn, 1889^{i c g}
- Longitarsus bicoloriceps Chjuo, 1937^{g}
- Longitarsus bonnairei (Allard, 1866)
- Longitarsus borisi Konstantinov, 2005
- Longitarsus brachypterus
- Longitarsus bremondi
- Longitarsus brevipennis Wollaston, 1860^{g}
- Longitarsus brisouti Heikertinger, 1912
- Longitarsus brunneus (Duftschmid, 1825)^{g}
- Longitarsus bulgaricus Gruev, 1973^{g}
- Longitarsus bytinskii
- Longitarsus caroli
- Longitarsus californicus (Motschulsky, 1845)^{i c g}
- Longitarsus callidus Warchalowski, 1967
- Longitarsus candidulus (Foudras, 1860)
- Longitarsus celticus Leonardi, 1975
- Longitarsus cerinthes (Schrank, 1798)^{g}
- Longitarsus chujoi Csiki, 1939^{g}
- Longitarsus cinerariae Wollaston, 1854^{g}
- Longitarsus cizeki Döberl, 2004
- Longitarsus codinai Madar & Madar, 1965^{g}
- Longitarsus corpulentus
- Longitarsus corynthius (Reiche & Saulcy, 1858)
- Longitarsus cotulus Blatchley, 1914^{i c g}
- Longitarsus croaticus Gruev, 1975^{g}
- Longitarsus curtus (Allard, 1860)^{g}
- Longitarsus cyanipennis Bryant, 1924^{g}
- Longitarsus danieli Mohr, 1962^{g}
- Longitarsus danilevskyi Konstantinov, 2005
- Longitarsus debernardii
- Longitarsus dlabolai
- Longitarsus dorsalis (Fabricius, 1781)^{g}
- Longitarsus echii (Koch, 1803)^{g}
- Longitarsus emarginatus
- Longitarsus eminatus
- Longitarsus eminus Warchałowski, 1967
- Longitarsus erro Horn, 1889^{i c g b}
- Longitarsus exsoletus (Linnaeus, 1758)^{g}
- Longitarsus fallax Weise, 1888
- Longitarsus ferrugineus (Foudras in Mulsant, 1859)^{i c g b}
- Longitarsus ferruginipennis Fuente, 1910^{g}
- Longitarsus flavicornis (Stephens, 1831)^{i c g}
- Longitarsus formosanus Chujo, 1937^{g}
- Longitarsus foudrasi Weise, 1893
- Longitarsus fowleri Allen, 1967^{g}
- Longitarsus frontosus Normand, 1947^{g}
- Longitarsus fulgens (Foudras, 1860)^{g}
- Longitarsus fuliginosus (Broun, 1880)^{g}
- Longitarsus fuscicornis Blatchley, 1919^{i c g}
- Longitarsus fuscoaeneus Redtenbacher, 1849^{g}
- Longitarsus ganglbaueri Heikertinger, 1912^{i c g b}
- Longitarsus gilli Gruev & Askevold
- Longitarsus girardi
- Longitarsus gloriae
- Longitarsus gomerensis Biondi, 1986^{g}
- Longitarsus gracilis Kutschera, 1864^{g}
- Longitarsus gruevi Leonardi & Mohr, 1974
- Longitarsus helvolus Kutschera, 1863^{g}
- Longitarsus hermonensis
- Longitarsus hittita
- Longitarsus hohuanshanus Kimoto, 1970^{g}
- Longitarsus holsaticus (Linnaeus, 1758)^{g}
- Longitarsus huberi LeSage, 1988^{i c g}
- Longitarsus ibericus Leonardi & Mohr, 1974^{g}
- Longitarsus iconiensis
- Longitarsus idilphilus
- Longitarsus igori Konstantinov, 2005
- Longitarsus impuncticollis Blatchley, 1923^{i c g}
- Longitarsus inconspicuus Wollaston, 1860^{g}
- Longitarsus insolens Horn, 1889^{i c g}
- Longitarsus ishikawai Kimoto, 1970^{g}
- Longitarsus isoplexidis Wollaston, 1854^{g}
- Longitarsus jacobaeae (Waterhouse, 1858)^{i c g b} (ragwort flea beetle)
- Longitarsus jailensis Heikertinger, 1913^{g}
- Longitarsus jandiensis Biondi, 1986^{g}
- Longitarsus juncicola (Foudras, 1860)
- Longitarsus karlheinzi Warchalowski, 1972^{g}
- Longitarsus khnsoriani
- Longitarsus kippenbergi
- Longitarsus kleiniiperda Wollaston, 1860^{g}
- Longitarsus kopdagiensis
- Longitarsus kutscherae (Rye, 1872)^{g}
- Longitarsus languidus Kutschera, 1863^{g}
- Longitarsus latens
- Longitarsus lateripunctatus (Rosenhauer, 1856)
- Longitarsus laureolae Biondi, 1988^{g}
- Longitarsus lederi
- Longitarsus ledouxi
- Longitarsus leonardii Doguet, 1973
- Longitarsus lewisii Baly, 1874^{g}
- Longitarsus limnophilae Prathapan & Viraktamath, 2011
- Longitarsus linnaei (Duftschmid, 1825)
- Longitarsus liratus Maulik
- Longitarsus livens J. L. LeConte, 1858^{i c g}
- Longitarsus longipennis Kutschera, 1864^{g}
- Longitarsus longiseta Weise, 1889^{g}
- Longitarsus luridus (Scopoli, 1763)^{i c g b}
- Longitarsus lycopi (Foudras, 1860)^{g}
- Longitarsus malandensis Weise, 1923
- Longitarsus mancus J. L. LeConte, 1858^{i c g}
- Longitarsus manfredi
- Longitarsus medvedevi Shapiro, 1956^{g}
- Longitarsus melanocephalus (De Geer, 1775)^{g}
- Longitarsus melanurus (F. E. Melsheimer, 1847)^{i c g b}
- Longitarsus membranaceus (Foudras, 1860)^{g}
- Longitarsus meridionalis
- Longitarsus messerschmidtiae Wollaston, 1860^{g}
- Longitarsus minimus Kutschera, 1863^{g}
- Longitarsus minusculus (Foudras, 1860)^{g}
- Longitarsus mirei
- Longitarsus misellus Blatchley, 1921^{i c g}
- Longitarsus monticola Kutschera, 1863^{g}
- Longitarsus montivagus Horn, 1889^{i c g}
- Longitarsus morrisonus Chujo, 1937^{g}
- Longitarsus nadiae ^{g}
- Longitarsus nakanei Kimoto, 1970^{g}
- Longitarsus nanus (Foudras, 1860)^{g}
- Longitarsus nasturtii (Fabricius, 1792)^{g}
- Longitarsus nebulosus (Allard, 1866)
- Longitarsus nemethi
- Longitarsus nervosus Wollaston, 1854^{g}
- Longitarsus niger (Koch, 1803)^{g}
- Longitarsus nigerrimus (Gyllenhal, 1827)^{g}
- Longitarsus nigrilividus
- Longitarsus nigrocephalus R. White, 1985^{i c g}
- Longitarsus nigrocillus (Motschulsky, 1849)
- Longitarsus nigrofasciatus (Goeze, 1777)^{g}
- Longitarsus nimrodi Furth, 1979^{g}
- Longitarsus nitidellus Cockerell, 1888^{i c g}
- Longitarsus noricus Leonardi, 1976^{g}
- Longitarsus nubigena Wollaston, 1854^{g}
- Longitarsus obliteratoides Gruev, 1973
- Longitarsus obliteratus (Rosenhauer, 1847)^{g}
- Longitarsus occidentalis Horn, 1889^{i c g}
- Longitarsus ochroleucus (Marsham, 1802)^{g}
- Longitarsus onosmae
- Longitarsus ordinatus (Foudras, 1860)^{g}
- Longitarsus oregonensis Horn, 1889^{i c g}
- Longitarsus pallescens Blatchley, 1924^{i c g}
- Longitarsus palliatus
- Longitarsus pallidicornis Kutschera, 1863
- Longitarsus pardoi Doguet, 1974
- Longitarsus parvulus (Paykull, 1799)^{g}
- Longitarsus pellucidus (Foudras in Mulsant, 1859)^{i c g b}
- Longitarsus perforatus Horn, 1889^{i c g}
- Longitarsus persimilis Wollaston, 1860^{g}
- Longitarsus personatus Weise, 1893
- Longitarsus petitpierrei Bastazo, 1997^{g}
- Longitarsus peyerimhoffi (Abeille, 1909)^{g}
- Longitarsus picicollis Weise, 1900^{g}
- Longitarsus pinguis Weise, 1888^{g}
- Longitarsus plantagomaritimus Dollman, 1912^{g}
- Longitarsus postremus Horn, 1889^{i c g}
- Longitarsus pratensis (Panzer, 1794)^{i c g b}
- Longitarsus pubescens
- Longitarsus pulmonariae Weise, 1893^{g}
- Longitarsus pygmaeus Horn, 1889^{i c g}
- Longitarsus quadriguttatus (Pontoppidan, 1763)^{i c g b}
- Longitarsus queenslandicus Csiki, 1939
- Longitarsus rangoonensis Jacoby
- Longitarsus ratshensis
- Longitarsus rectilineatus (Foudras, 1860)
- Longitarsus refugiensis Leonardi & Mohr, 1974^{g}
- Longitarsus reichei (Allard, 1860)^{g}
- Longitarsus repandus J. L. LeConte, 1858^{i c g}
- Longitarsus rubellus (Foudras, 1860)^{g}
- Longitarsus rubiginosus (Foudras in Mulsant, 1859)^{i c g b}
- Longitarsus rufescens Horn, 1889^{i c g}
- Longitarsus rutilus (Illiger, 1807)^{g}
- Longitarsus salarius
- Longitarsus saltatus Blatchley, 1921^{i c g}
- Longitarsus salviae Gruev, 1975
- Longitarsus sari Maulik
- Longitarsus saulicus
- Longitarsus scaphidioides Abeille, 1896^{g}
- Longitarsus scrobipennis Heikertinger, 1913^{g}
- Longitarsus scutellaris (Rey, 1847)
- Longitarsus sencieri (Allard, 1860)^{g}
- Longitarsus serrulatus ^{g}
- Longitarsus solaris Gruev, 1977^{g}
- Longitarsus solidaginis Horn, 1889^{i c g}
- Longitarsus springeri Leonardi, 1975^{g}
- Longitarsus stragulatus (Foudras, 1860)^{g}
- Longitarsus strigicollis Wollaston, 1864
- Longitarsus subcylindricus Blatchley, 1920^{i c g}
- Longitarsus submaculatus Kutschera, 1863^{g}
- Longitarsus subrufus J. L. LeConte, 1859^{i c g b} (marbleseed flea beetle)
- Longitarsus substriatus Kutschera, 1863^{g}
- Longitarsus succineus (Foudras in Mulsant, 1859)^{i c g b}
- Longitarsus suspectus Blatchley, 1921^{i c g b}
- Longitarsus suturatus (Foudras, 1860)
- Longitarsus suturellus (Duftschmid, 1825)
- Longitarsus symphyti Heikertinger, 1912^{g}
- Longitarsus tabidus (Fabricius, 1775)^{g}
- Longitarsus taiwanicus Chen, 1934^{g}
- Longitarsus tantulus (Foudras, 1860)
- Longitarsus tarraconensis Leonardi, 1979^{g}
- Longitarsus tenuicornis Blatchley, 1923^{i c g}
- Longitarsus testaceus (F. E. Melsheimer, 1847)^{i c g b}
- Longitarsus thymalearum
- Longitarsus tmetopterus Jacobson^{g}
- Longitarsus traductus Horn, 1889^{i c g}
- Longitarsus trepidus
- Longitarsus tristis Weise, 1888^{g}
- Longitarsus truncatellus Weise, 1890^{g}
- Longitarsus tunetanus Csiki, 1940^{g}
- Longitarsus turbatus Horn, 1889^{i c g b}
- Longitarsus vanus Horn, 1889^{i c g}
- Longitarsus varicornis Suffrian, 1868^{i c g b}
- Longitarsus velai Bastazo, 1997^{g}
- Longitarsus ventricosus
- Longitarsus victoriensis Blackburn, 1896
- Longitarsus vilis Wollaston, 1864^{g}
- Longitarsus violentoides
- Longitarsus violentus Weise, 1893^{g}
- Longitarsus waltherhorni Csiki, 1934^{g}
- Longitarsus warchalowskianus Furth, 2007^{g}
- Longitarsus warchalowskii Scherer, 1969^{g}
- Longitarsus weisei
- Longitarsus zangherii Warchalowski, 1968^{g}

Data sources: i = ITIS, c = Catalogue of Life, g = GBIF, b = Bugguide.net
