= List of leaf beetle (Chrysomelidae) species recorded in Great Britain =

The following is a list of the leaf beetles recorded in Great Britain. For other beetle families, see the parent article List of beetle species of Great Britain.

- Bruchus atomarius (Linnaeus, 1761)
- Bruchus ervi Frölich, 1799
- Bruchus loti Paykull, 1800
- Bruchus pisorum (Linnaeus, 1758)
- Bruchus rufimanus Boheman, 1833
- Bruchus rufipes Herbst, 1783
- Bruchidius cisti (Fabricius, 1775)
- Bruchidius incarnatus (Boheman, 1833)
- Bruchidius olivaceus (Germar, 1824)
- Bruchidius varius (Olivier, 1795)
- Bruchidius villosus (Fabricius, 1793)
- Acanthoscelides obtectus (Say, 1831)
- Callosobruchus chinensis (Linnaeus, 1758)
- Callosobruchus maculatus (Fabricius, 1775)
- Macroplea appendiculata (Panzer, 1794)
- Macroplea mutica (Fabricius, 1793)
- Donacia aquatica (Linnaeus, 1758)
- Donacia bicolora Zschach, 1788
- Donacia cinerea Herbst, 1784
- Donacia clavipes Fabricius, 1793
- Donacia crassipes Fabricius, 1775
- Donacia dentata Hoppe, 1795
- Donacia impressa Paykull, 1799
- Donacia marginata Hoppe, 1795
- Donacia obscura Gyllenhal, 1813
- Donacia semicuprea Panzer, 1796
- Donacia simplex Fabricius, 1775
- Donacia sparganii Ahrens, 1810
- Donacia thalassina Germar, 1811
- Donacia versicolorea (Brahm, 1791)
- Donacia vulgaris Zschach, 1788
- Plateumaris affinis (Kunze, 1818)
- Plateumaris bracata (Scopoli, 1772)
- Plateumaris discolor (Panzer, 1795)
- Plateumaris sericea (Linnaeus, 1758)
- Lema cyanella (Linnaeus, 1758)
- Oulema erichsoni (Suffrian, 1841)
- Oulema melanopus (Linnaeus, 1758)
- Oulema obscura (Stephens, 1831)
- Oulema rufocyanea (Suffrian, 1847)
- Oulema septentrionis (Weise, 1880)
- Crioceris asparagi (Linnaeus, 1758)
- Lilioceris lilii (Scopoli, 1763)
- Labidostomis tridentata (Linnaeus, 1758)
- Clytra laeviuscula Ratzeburg, 1837
- Clytra quadripunctata (Linnaeus, 1758)
- Smaragdina affinis (Illiger, 1794)
- Cryptocephalus aureolus Suffrian, 1847
- Cryptocephalus biguttatus (Scopoli, 1763)
- Cryptocephalus bilineatus (Linnaeus, 1767)
- Cryptocephalus bipunctatus (Linnaeus, 1758)
- Cryptocephalus coryli (Linnaeus, 1758)
- Cryptocephalus decemmaculatus (Linnaeus, 1758)
- Cryptocephalus exiguus Schneider, 1792
- Cryptocephalus frontalis Marsham, 1802
- Cryptocephalus fulvus (Goeze, 1777)
- Cryptocephalus hypochaeridis (Linnaeus, 1758)
- Cryptocephalus labiatus (Linnaeus, 1761)
- Cryptocephalus moraei (Linnaeus, 1758)
- Cryptocephalus nitidulus Fabricius, 1787
- Cryptocephalus parvulus O. F. Müller, 1776
- Cryptocephalus primarius Harold, 1872
- Cryptocephalus punctiger Paykull, 1799
- Cryptocephalus pusillus Fabricius, 1777
- Cryptocephalus querceti Suffrian, 1848
- Cryptocephalus sexpunctatus (Linnaeus, 1758)
- Cryptocephalus violaceus Laicharting, 1781
- Oomorphus concolor (Sturm, 1807)
- Bromius obscurus (Linnaeus, 1758)
- Timarcha goettingensis (Linnaeus, 1758)
- Timarcha tenebricosa (Fabricius, 1775)
- Chrysolina americana (Linnaeus, 1758)
- Chrysolina banksi (Fabricius, 1775)
- Chrysolina brunsvicensis (Gravenhorst, 1807)
- Chrysolina caerulans (Scriba, 1791)
- Chrysolina cerealis (Linnaeus, 1767)
- Chrysolina fastuosa (Scopoli, 1763)
- Chrysolina graminis (Linnaeus, 1758)
- Chrysolina haemoptera (Linnaeus, 1758)
- Chrysolina herbacea (Duftschmid, 1825)
- Chrysolina hyperici (Forster, 1771)
- Chrysolina intermedia (Franz, 1938)
- Chrysolina marginata (Linnaeus, 1758)
- Chrysolina oricalcia (O. F. Müller, 1776)
- Chrysolina polita (Linnaeus, 1758)
- Chrysolina sanguinolenta (Linnaeus, 1758)
- Chrysolina staphylaea (Linnaeus, 1758)
- Chrysolina varians (Schaller, 1783)
- Chrysolina violacea (O. F. Müller, 1776)
- Gastrophysa polygoni (Linnaeus, 1758)
- Gastrophysa viridula (De Geer, 1775)
- Phaedon armoraciae (Linnaeus, 1758)
- Phaedon cochleariae (Fabricius, 1792)
- Phaedon concinnus Stephens, 1831
- Phaedon tumidulus (Germar, 1824)
- Hydrothassa glabra (Herbst, 1783)
- Hydrothassa hannoveriana (Fabricius, 1775)
- Hydrothassa marginella (Linnaeus, 1758)
- Prasocuris junci (Brahm, 1790)
- Prasocuris phellandrii (Linnaeus, 1758)
- Plagiodera versicolora (Laicharting, 1781)
- Chrysomela aenea Linnaeus, 1758
- Chrysomela populi Linnaeus, 1758
- Chrysomela tremula Fabricius, 1787
- Chrysomela vigintipunctata Scopoli, 1763
- Gonioctena decemnotata (Marsham, 1802)
- Gonioctena olivacea (Forster, 1771)
- Gonioctena pallida (Linnaeus, 1758)
- Gonioctena viminalis (Linnaeus, 1758)
- Phratora laticollis Suffrian, 1851
- Phratora polaris Schneider, 1886
- Phratora vitellinae (Linnaeus, 1758)
- Phratora vulgatissima (Linnaeus, 1758)
- Galerucella calmariensis (Linnaeus, 1767)
- Galerucella lineola (Fabricius, 1781)
- Galerucella nymphaeae (Linnaeus, 1758)
- Galerucella pusilla (Duftschmid, 1825)
- Galerucella sagittariae (Gyllenhal, 1813)
- Galerucella tenella (Linnaeus, 1761)
- Pyrrhalta viburni (Paykull, 1799)
- Xanthogaleruca luteola (O. F. Müller, 1766)
- Galeruca laticollis (C. R. Sahlberg, 1838)
- Galeruca tanaceti (Linnaeus, 1758)
- Lochmaea caprea (Linnaeus, 1758)
- Lochmaea crataegi (Forster, 1771)
- Lochmaea suturalis (C. G. Thomson, 1866)
- Diabrotica virgifera LeConte, 1858
- Phyllobrotica quadrimaculata (Linnaeus, 1758)
- Luperus flavipes (Linnaeus, 1767)
- Luperus longicornis (Fabricius, 1781)
- Calomicrus circumfusus (Marsham, 1802)
- Agelastica alni (Linnaeus, 1758)
- Sermylassa halensis (Linnaeus, 1767)
- Luperomorpha xanthodera (Fairmaire, 1888)
- Phyllotreta atra (Fabricius, 1775)
- Phyllotreta consobrina (Curtis, 1837)
- Phyllotreta cruciferae (Goeze, 1777)
- Phyllotreta diademata Foudras, 1860
- Phyllotreta exclamationis (Thunberg, 1784)
- Phyllotreta flexuosa (Illiger, 1794)
- Phyllotreta nemorum (Linnaeus, 1758)
- Phyllotreta nigripes (Fabricius, 1775)
- Phyllotreta nodicornis (Marsham, 1802)
- Phyllotreta ochripes (Curtis, 1837)
- Phyllotreta punctulata (Marsham, 1802)
- Phyllotreta striolata (Fabricius, 1803)
- Phyllotreta tetrastigma (Comolli, 1837)
- Phyllotreta undulata Kutschera, 1860
- Phyllotreta vittula (Redtenbacher, 1849)
- Aphthona atratula Allard, 1859
- Aphthona atrocaerulea (Stephens, 1829)
- Aphthona euphorbiae (Schrank, 1781)
- Aphthona herbigrada (Curtis, 1837)
- Aphthona lutescens (Gyllenhal, 1808)
- Aphthona melancholica Weise, 1888
- Aphthona nigriceps (Redtenbacher, 1842)
- Aphthona nonstriata (Goeze, 1777)
- Longitarsus absynthii Kutschera, 1862
- Longitarsus aeneicollis (Faldermann, 1837)
- Longitarsus aeruginosus (Foudras, 1860)
- Longitarsus agilis (Rye, 1868)
- Longitarsus anchusae (Paykull, 1799)
- Longitarsus atricillus (Linnaeus, 1761)
- Longitarsus ballotae (Marsham, 1802)
- Longitarsus brunneus (Duftschmid, 1825)
- Longitarsus curtus (Allard, 1860)
- Longitarsus dorsalis (Fabricius, 1781)
- Longitarsus exoletus (Linnaeus, 1758)
- Longitarsus ferrugineus (Foudras, 1860)
- Longitarsus flavicornis (Stephens, 1831)
- Longitarsus fowleri Allen, 1967
- Longitarsus ganglbaueri Heikertinger, 1912
- Longitarsus gracilis Kutschera, 1864
- Longitarsus holsaticus (Linnaeus, 1758)
- Longitarsus jacobaeae (G. R. Waterhouse, 1858)
- Longitarsus kutscherae (Rye, 1872)
- Longitarsus longiseta Weise, 1889
- Longitarsus luridus (Scopoli, 1763)
- Longitarsus lycopi (Foudras, 1860)
- Longitarsus melanocephalus (De Geer, 1775)
- Longitarsus membranaceus (Foudras, 1860)
- Longitarsus nasturtii (Fabricius, 1793)
- Longitarsus nigerrimus (Gyllenhal, 1827)
- Longitarsus nigrofasciatus (Goeze, 1777)
- Longitarsus obliteratoides Gruev, 1973
- Longitarsus obliteratus (Rosenhauer, 1847)
- Longitarsus ochroleucus (Marsham, 1802)
- Longitarsus parvulus (Paykull, 1799)
- Longitarsus pellucidus (Foudras, 1860)
- Longitarsus plantagomaritimus Dollman, 1912
- Longitarsus pratensis (Panzer, 1794)
- Longitarsus quadriguttatus (Pontoppidan, 1763)
- Longitarsus reichei (Allard, 1860)
- Longitarsus rubiginosus (Foudras, 1860)
- Longitarsus rutilus (Illiger, 1807)
- Longitarsus succineus (Foudras, 1860)
- Longitarsus suturellus (Duftschmid, 1825)
- Longitarsus tabidus (Fabricius, 1775)
- Altica brevicollis Foudras, 1860
- Altica carinthiaca Weise, 1888
- Altica ericeti (Allard, 1859)
- Altica helianthemi (Allard, 1859)
- Altica lythri Aubé, 1843
- Altica oleracea (Linnaeus, 1758)
- Altica palustris Weise, 1888
- Hermaeophaga mercurialis (Fabricius, 1793)
- Batophila aerata (Marsham, 1802)
- Batophila rubi (Paykull, 1799)
- Lythraria salicariae (Paykull, 1800)
- Ochrosis ventralis (Illiger, 1807)
- Neocrepidodera ferruginea (Scopoli, 1763)
- Neocrepidodera impressa (Fabricius, 1801)
- Neocrepidodera transversa (Marsham, 1802)
- Derocrepis rufipes (Linnaeus, 1758)
- Hippuriphila modeeri (Linnaeus, 1761)
- Crepidodera aurata (Marsham, 1802)
- Crepidodera aurea (Fourcroy, 1785)
- Crepidodera fulvicornis (Fabricius, 1793)
- Crepidodera nitidula (Linnaeus, 1758)
- Crepidodera plutus (Latreille, 1804)
- Epitrix atropae Foudras, 1860
- Epitrix pubescens (J. D. W. Koch, 1803)
- Podagrica fuscicornis (Linnaeus, 1767)
- Podagrica fuscipes (Fabricius, 1775)
- Mantura chrysanthemi (J. D. W. Koch, 1803)
- Mantura matthewsii (Curtis, 1833)
- Mantura obtusata (Gyllenhal, 1813)
- Mantura rustica (Linnaeus, 1767)
- Chaetocnema aerosa (Letzner, 1847)
- Chaetocnema arida Foudras, 1860
- Chaetocnema concinna (Marsham, 1802)
- Chaetocnema confusa (Boheman, 1851)
- Chaetocnema hortensis (Fourcroy, 1785)
- Chaetocnema picipes Stephens, 1831
- Chaetocnema sahlbergii (Gyllenhal, 1827)
- Chaetocnema subcoerulea (Kutschera, 1864)
- Sphaeroderma rubidum (Graëlls, 1858)
- Sphaeroderma testaceum (Fabricius, 1775)
- Apteropeda globosa (Illiger, 1794)
- Apteropeda orbiculata (Marsham, 1802)
- Apteropeda splendida Allard, 1860
- Mniophila muscorum (J. D. W. Koch, 1803)
- Dibolia cynoglossi (J. D. W. Koch, 1803)
- Psylliodes affinis (Paykull, 1799)
- Psylliodes attenuata (J. D. W. Koch, 1803)
- Psylliodes chalcomera (Illiger, 1807)
- Psylliodes chrysocephala (Linnaeus, 1758)
- Psylliodes cucullata (Illiger, 1807)
- Psylliodes cuprea (J. D. W. Koch, 1803)
- Psylliodes dulcamarae (J. D. W. Koch, 1803)
- Psylliodes hyoscyami (Linnaeus, 1758)
- Psylliodes laticollis Kutschera, 1860
- Psylliodes luridipennis Kutschera, 1864
- Psylliodes luteola (O. F. Müller, 1776)
- Psylliodes marcida (Illiger, 1807)
- Psylliodes napi (Fabricius, 1793)
- Psylliodes picina (Marsham, 1802)
- Psylliodes sophiae Heikertinger, 1914
- Pilemostoma fastuosa (Schaller, 1783)
- Hypocassida subferruginea (Schrank, 1776)
- Cassida denticollis Suffrian, 1844
- Cassida flaveola Thunberg, 1794
- Cassida hemisphaerica Herbst, 1799
- Cassida murraea Linnaeus, 1767
- Cassida nebulosa Linnaeus, 1758
- Cassida nobilis Linnaeus, 1758
- Cassida prasina Illiger, 1798
- Cassida rubiginosa O. F. Müller, 1776
- Cassida sanguinosa Suffrian, 1844
- Cassida vibex Linnaeus, 1767
- Cassida viridis Linnaeus, 1758
- Cassida vittata de Villers, 1789
