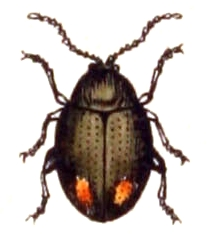

Scientific classification
- Kingdom: Animalia
- Phylum: Arthropoda
- Class: Insecta
- Order: Coleoptera
- Suborder: Polyphaga
- Infraorder: Cucujiformia
- Family: Chrysomelidae
- Tribe: Alticini
- Genus: Hippuriphila; Foudras in Mulsant, 1859

= Hippuriphila =

Genus of beetles

Hippuriphila is a genus of flea beetles in the family Chrysomelidae. There are 3 described species from the Nearctic and Palaearctic.

== Species ==
- Hippuriphila canadensis Brown, 1942
- Hippuriphila equiseti Beller & Hatch, 1932
- Hippuriphila modeeri (Linnaeus, 1760) (= mancula)
