= Longitarsus candidulus =

Scientific classification
- Kingdom: Animalia
- Phylum: Arthropoda
- Clade: Pancrustacea
- Class: Insecta
- Order: Coleoptera
- Suborder: Polyphaga
- Infraorder: Cucujiformia
- Family: Chrysomelidae
- Genus: Longitarsus
- Species: L. candidulus

Binomial name
- Longitarsus candidulus (Foudras, 1860)

Species of beetle

Longitarsus candidulus is a species of beetle in the subfamily Galerucinae that can be found in Croatia, France, Italy (including the islands of Corsica and Sardinia), Portugal, Spain, and Yugoslavia.
