= Longitarsus alfierii alfierii =

Scientific classification
- Kingdom: Animalia
- Phylum: Arthropoda
- Clade: Pancrustacea
- Class: Insecta
- Order: Coleoptera
- Suborder: Polyphaga
- Infraorder: Cucujiformia
- Family: Chrysomelidae
- Genus: Longitarsus
- Species: L. alfierii
- Subspecies: L. a. alfierii

Trinomial name
- Longitarsus alfierii alfierii Pic, 1923

Subspecies of beetle

Longitarsus alfierii is a subspecies of beetle in the Galerucinae subfamily that is endemic to Greece.
