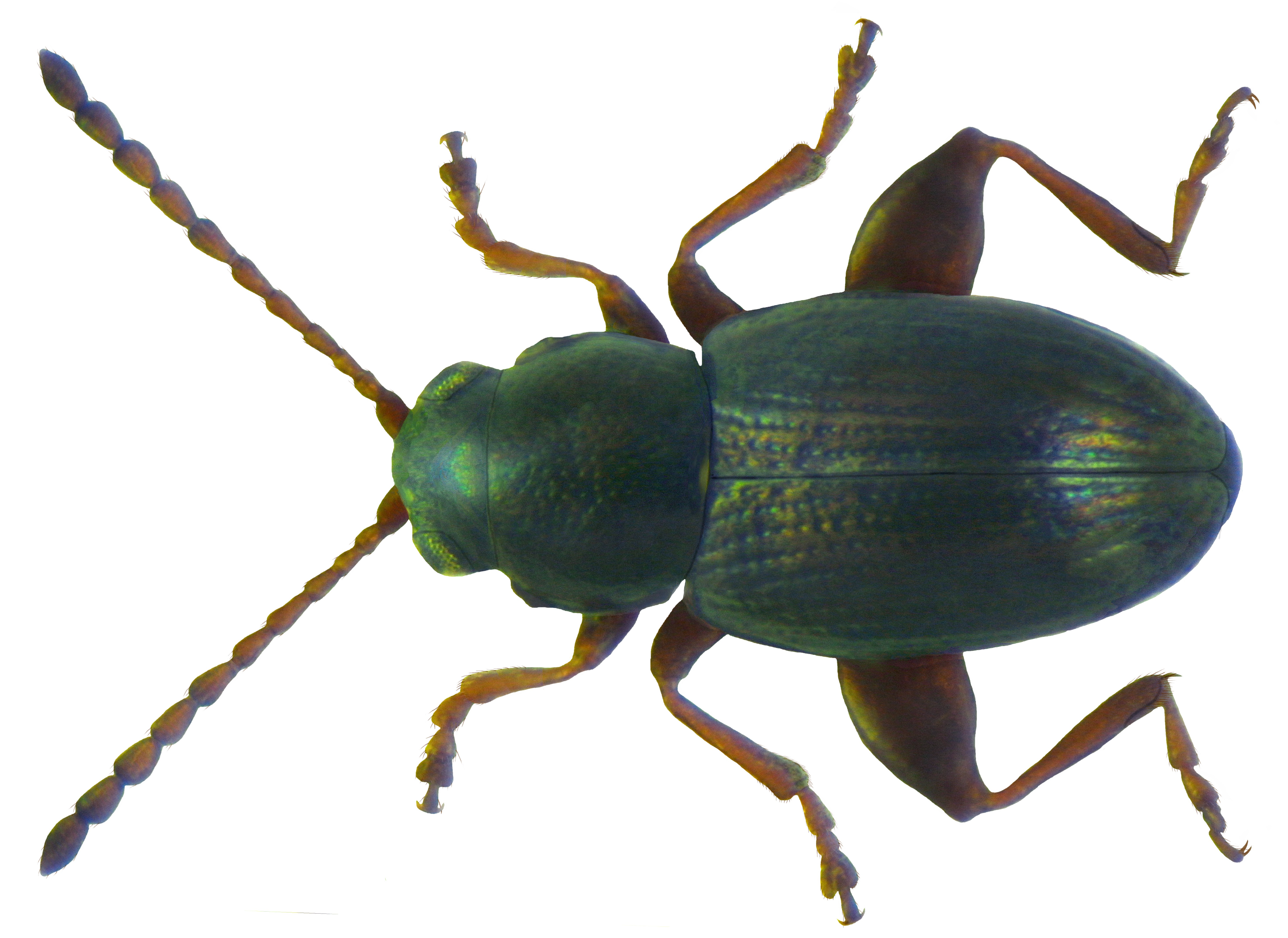
- Batophila aerata

Scientific classification
- Domain: Eukaryota
- Kingdom: Animalia
- Phylum: Arthropoda
- Class: Insecta
- Order: Coleoptera
- Suborder: Polyphaga
- Infraorder: Cucujiformia
- Superfamily: Chrysomeloidea
- Family: Chrysomelidae
- Subfamily: Galerucinae
- Tribe: Alticini
- Genus: Batophila; Foudras, 1860

Synonyms
- Balophila Blackwelder, 1946

= Batophila =

Genus of beetles

Batophila is a genus of beetles belonging to the family Chrysomelidae, containing some 30 species in the Palaearctic and Oriental regions.

== Selected species ==
- Batophila aerata
- Batophila rubi
- Batophila rubiginosus
