= Longitarsus ventricosus =

Scientific classification
- Kingdom: Animalia
- Phylum: Arthropoda
- Clade: Pancrustacea
- Class: Insecta
- Order: Coleoptera
- Suborder: Polyphaga
- Infraorder: Cucujiformia
- Family: Chrysomelidae
- Genus: Longitarsus
- Species: L. ventricosus

Binomial name
- Longitarsus ventricosus (Foudras, 1860)

Synonyms
- Teinodactyla ventricosa Foudras, 1860; Teinodactyla gibbosa Foudras, 1860; Teinodactyla subrotunda Allard, 1860

Species of beetle

Longitarsus ventricosus is a species of beetle in the subfamily Galerucinae that can be found in France and Northern Spain.
