= Longitarsus erro =

Scientific classification
- Kingdom: Animalia
- Phylum: Arthropoda
- Clade: Pancrustacea
- Class: Insecta
- Order: Coleoptera
- Suborder: Polyphaga
- Infraorder: Cucujiformia
- Family: Chrysomelidae
- Genus: Longitarsus
- Species: L. erro

Binomial name
- Longitarsus erro Horn, 1889

Species of beetle

Longitarsus erro is a species of flea beetle in the family Chrysomelidae. L. erro is found in North America, specifically Canada.
