= Longitarsus albus =

Scientific classification
- Kingdom: Animalia
- Phylum: Arthropoda
- Clade: Pancrustacea
- Class: Insecta
- Order: Coleoptera
- Suborder: Polyphaga
- Infraorder: Cucujiformia
- Family: Chrysomelidae
- Genus: Longitarsus
- Species: L. albus

Binomial name
- Longitarsus albus Fritzlar, 2001

Synonyms
- Thyamis alba Allard, 1866

Species of beetle

Longitarsus albus is a yellow coloured species of beetle from the Chrysomelidae family that can be found in Algeria, Israel, and Morocco.
