= Longitarsus audisioi =

Scientific classification
- Kingdom: Animalia
- Phylum: Arthropoda
- Clade: Pancrustacea
- Class: Insecta
- Order: Coleoptera
- Suborder: Polyphaga
- Infraorder: Cucujiformia
- Family: Chrysomelidae
- Genus: Longitarsus
- Species: L. audisioi

Binomial name
- Longitarsus audisioi Biondi, 1992

Species of beetle

Longitarsus audisioi is a species of beetle in the subfamily Galerucinae that can be found in the village of Trabzon in Turkey.
