= Longitarsus vilis =

Scientific classification
- Kingdom: Animalia
- Phylum: Arthropoda
- Clade: Pancrustacea
- Class: Insecta
- Order: Coleoptera
- Suborder: Polyphaga
- Infraorder: Cucujiformia
- Family: Chrysomelidae
- Genus: Longitarsus
- Species: L. vilis

Binomial name
- Longitarsus vilis Wollaston, 1864

Species of beetle

Longitarsus vilis is a species of beetle in the subfamily Galerucinae that is can be found on Canary Islands, in such European countries as Portugal, Spain, and also on Italian islands such as Sardinia and Sicily and the Italian mainland. It can also be found in African countries such as Algeria and Morocco and is also common in Italian region of Calabria.
