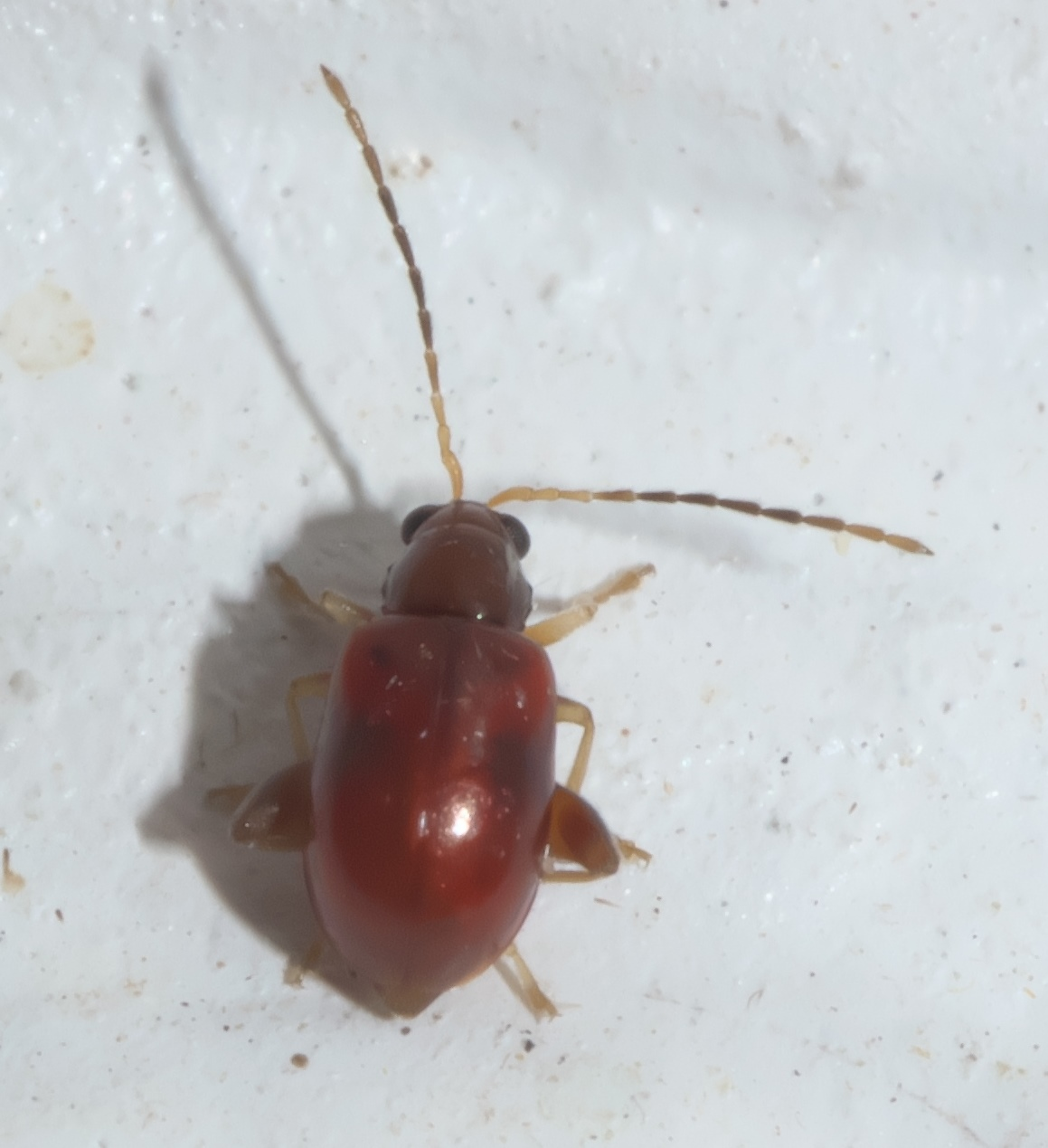

Scientific classification
- Kingdom: Animalia
- Phylum: Arthropoda
- Clade: Pancrustacea
- Class: Insecta
- Order: Coleoptera
- Suborder: Polyphaga
- Infraorder: Cucujiformia
- Family: Chrysomelidae
- Genus: Longitarsus
- Species: L. varicornis

Binomial name
- Longitarsus varicornis Suffrian, 1868

= Longitarsus varicornis =

Species of beetle

Longitarsus varicornis is a species of flea beetle in the family Chrysomelidae. It is found in the Caribbean Sea, Central America, North America, and South America.

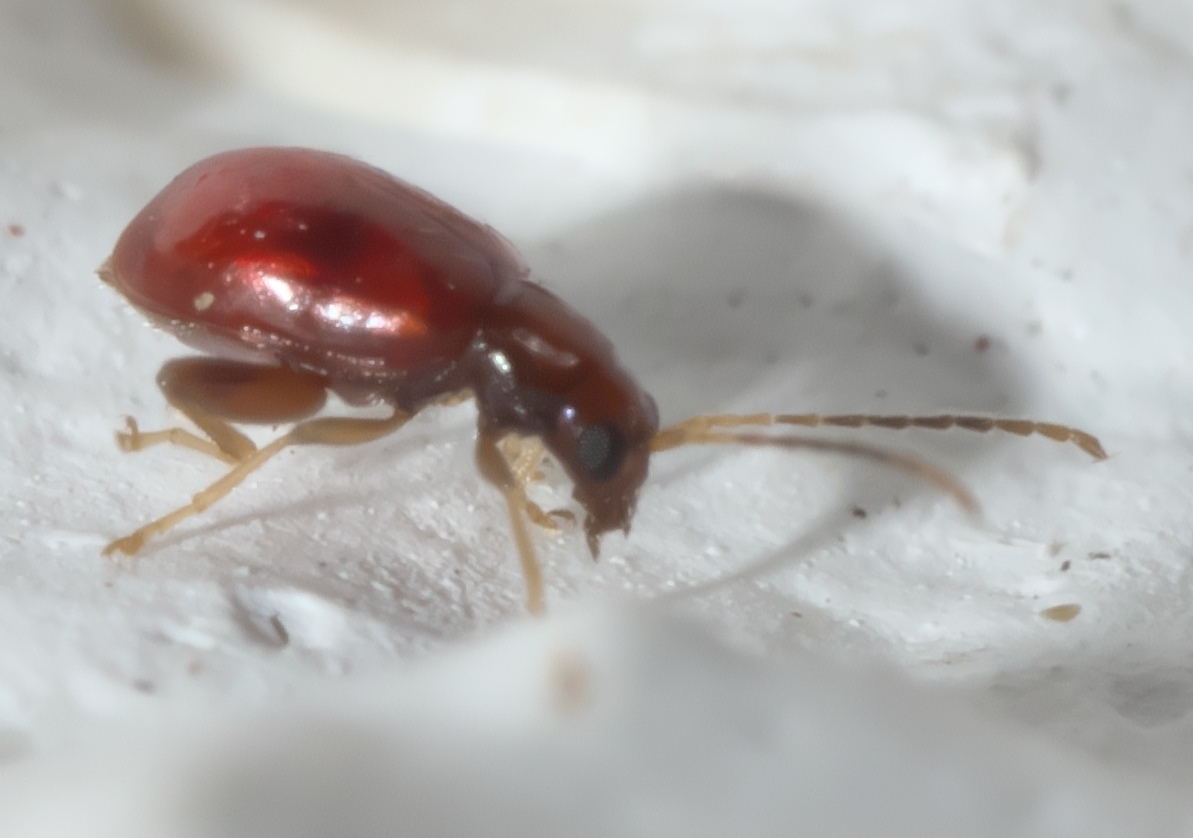
