= Longitarsus ferruginipennis =

Scientific classification
- Kingdom: Animalia
- Phylum: Arthropoda
- Clade: Pancrustacea
- Class: Insecta
- Order: Coleoptera
- Suborder: Polyphaga
- Infraorder: Cucujiformia
- Family: Chrysomelidae
- Genus: Longitarsus
- Species: L. ferruginipennis

Binomial name
- Longitarsus ferruginipennis Fuente, 1910

Synonyms
- Longitarsus caroli Bastazo & Raso 1985; Longitarsus seticollis Mohr 1962

Species of beetle

Longitarsus ferruginipennis is a species of beetle in the subfamily Galerucinae that is endemic to Spain.
