= Longitarsus cinerariae =

Scientific classification
- Kingdom: Animalia
- Phylum: Arthropoda
- Clade: Pancrustacea
- Class: Insecta
- Order: Coleoptera
- Suborder: Polyphaga
- Infraorder: Cucujiformia
- Family: Chrysomelidae
- Genus: Longitarsus
- Species: L. cinerariae

Binomial name
- Longitarsus cinerariae Wollaston, 1854

Synonyms
- Longitarsus caroli Bastazo & Raso, 1985; Longitarsus seticollis Mohr, 1962

Species of beetle

Longitarsus cinerariae is a species of beetle in the subfamily Galerucinae that is endemic to Madeira.

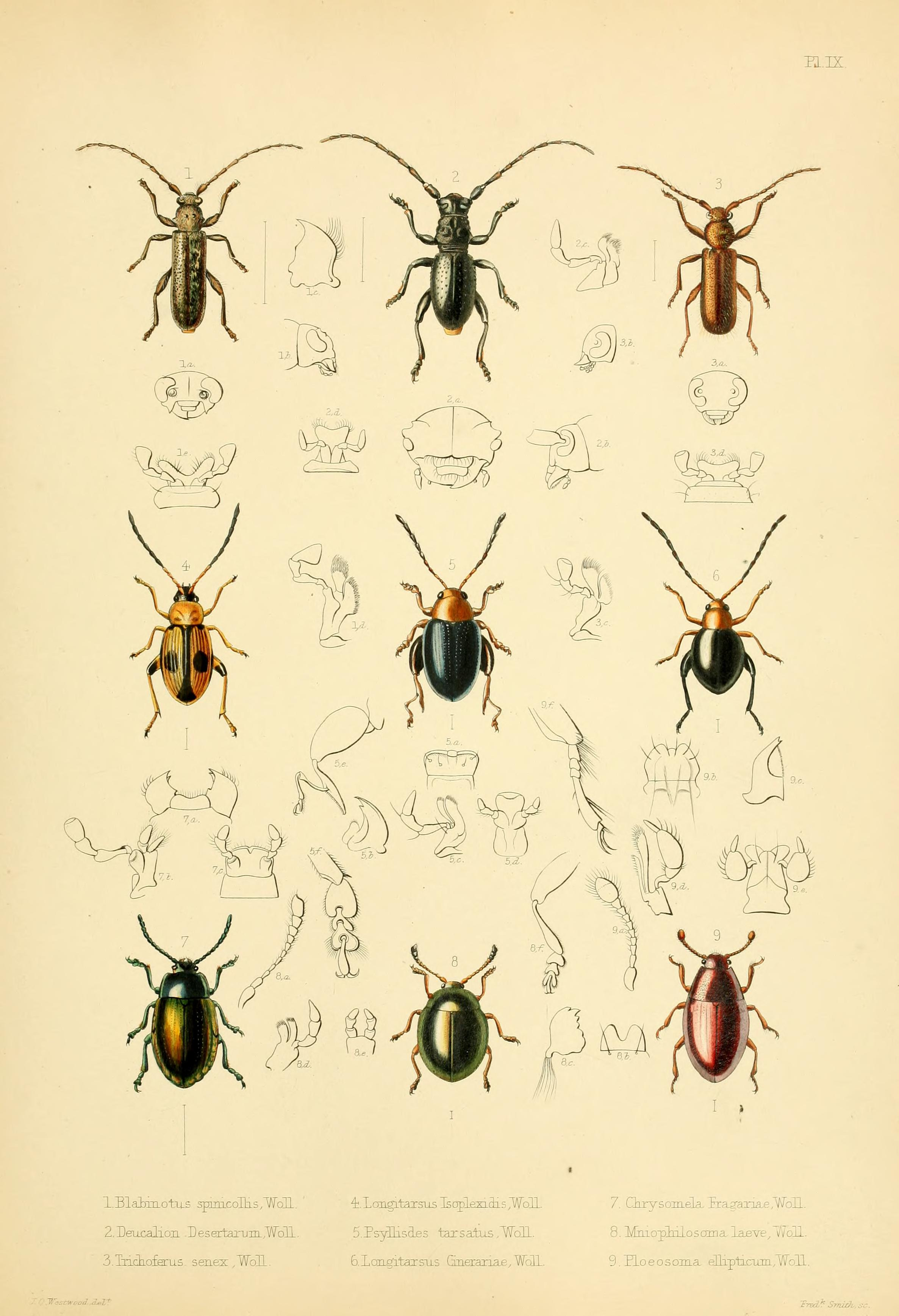
Fig 6 in Plate IX Insecta maderensia illustrates this species.
