= Hippuriphila canadensis =

Scientific classification
- Kingdom: Animalia
- Phylum: Arthropoda
- Class: Insecta
- Order: Coleoptera
- Suborder: Polyphaga
- Infraorder: Cucujiformia
- Family: Chrysomelidae
- Genus: Hippuriphila
- Species: H. canadensis

Binomial name
- Hippuriphila canadensis Brown, 1942

Species of beetle

Hippuriphila canadensis is a species of flea beetle in the family Chrysomelidae. It is found in North America.
