= Longitarsus angelikae =

Scientific classification
- Kingdom: Animalia
- Phylum: Arthropoda
- Clade: Pancrustacea
- Class: Insecta
- Order: Coleoptera
- Suborder: Polyphaga
- Infraorder: Cucujiformia
- Family: Chrysomelidae
- Genus: Longitarsus
- Species: L. angelikae

Binomial name
- Longitarsus angelikae Fritzlar, 2001

Species of beetle

Longitarsus angelikae is a dark yellow coloured species of beetle from the Chrysomelidae family that is endemic to Antalya, Turkey.
