= Hippuriphila equiseti =

Scientific classification
- Kingdom: Animalia
- Phylum: Arthropoda
- Class: Insecta
- Order: Coleoptera
- Suborder: Polyphaga
- Infraorder: Cucujiformia
- Family: Chrysomelidae
- Genus: Hippuriphila
- Species: H. equiseti

Binomial name
- Hippuriphila equiseti Beller & Hatch, 1932

Species of beetle

Hippuriphila equiseti is a species of flea beetle in the family Chrysomelidae. It is found in North America.
