= Longitarsus celticus =

Scientific classification
- Kingdom: Animalia
- Phylum: Arthropoda
- Clade: Pancrustacea
- Class: Insecta
- Order: Coleoptera
- Suborder: Polyphaga
- Infraorder: Cucujiformia
- Family: Chrysomelidae
- Genus: Longitarsus
- Species: L. celticus

Binomial name
- Longitarsus celticus (Leonardi, 1975)

Species of beetle

Longitarsus celticus is a species of beetle in the subfamily Galerucinae that can be found in Austria, Czech Republic, France, Germany, Italy, Spain, Switzerland, Ukraine, and Yugoslavia.
