= Longitarsus aramaicus =

Scientific classification
- Kingdom: Animalia
- Phylum: Arthropoda
- Clade: Pancrustacea
- Class: Insecta
- Order: Coleoptera
- Suborder: Polyphaga
- Infraorder: Cucujiformia
- Family: Chrysomelidae
- Genus: Longitarsus
- Species: L. aramaicus

Binomial name
- Longitarsus aramaicus Leonardi, 1979

Species of beetle

Longitarsus aramaicus is a species of beetle in the subfamily Galerucinae that can be found on Cyprus, and in Asian countries such as Israel, Jordan, Turkey, and Ramallah, Palestine.
