= Longitarsus eminus =

Scientific classification
- Kingdom: Animalia
- Phylum: Arthropoda
- Clade: Pancrustacea
- Class: Insecta
- Order: Coleoptera
- Suborder: Polyphaga
- Infraorder: Cucujiformia
- Family: Chrysomelidae
- Genus: Longitarsus
- Species: L. eminus

Binomial name
- Longitarsus eminus Warchałowski, 1967

Synonyms
- Longitarsus eminus Warchałowski, 1967

Species of beetle

Longitarsus eminus is a species of beetle from Chrysomelidae family that can be found in Asian countries such as Afghanistan, Iran, Iraq, Israel, and Turkey.
