= Longitarsus alfierii =

Scientific classification
- Kingdom: Animalia
- Phylum: Arthropoda
- Clade: Pancrustacea
- Class: Insecta
- Order: Coleoptera
- Suborder: Polyphaga
- Infraorder: Cucujiformia
- Family: Chrysomelidae
- Genus: Longitarsus
- Species: L. alfierii

Binomial name
- Longitarsus alfierii Pic, 1923

Synonyms
- Longitarsus klapperichi Gruev, 1973

Species of beetle

Longitarsus alfierii is a species of beetle in the Galerucinae subfamily that can be found in such European countries as Bulgaria, Greece, North Macedonia, Spain, Ukraine, Yugoslavia, and on Crete. It is also common in Near East and North Africa as well.

== Subspecies ==
- Longitarsus alfierii alfierii Pic, 1923
- Longitarsus alfierii furthi Gruev, 1982
