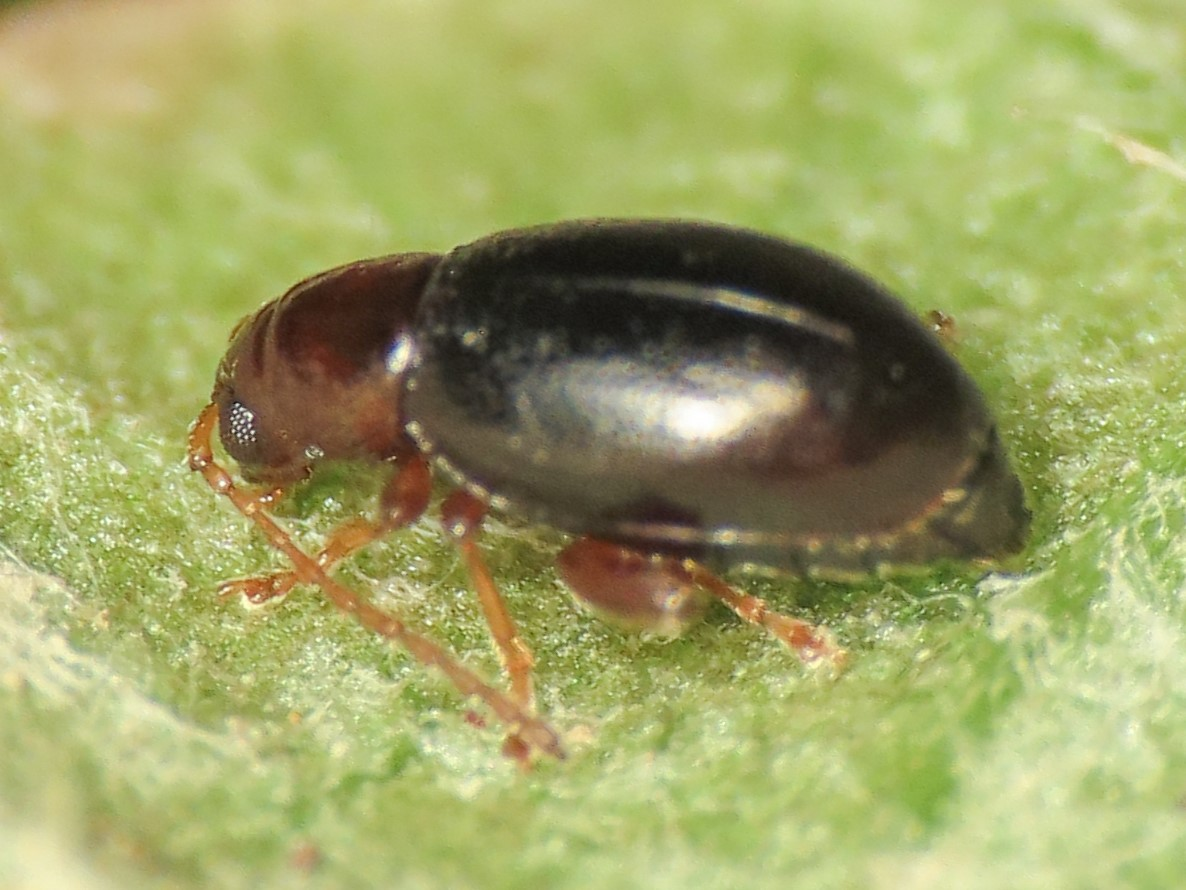

Scientific classification
- Kingdom: Animalia
- Phylum: Arthropoda
- Clade: Pancrustacea
- Class: Insecta
- Order: Coleoptera
- Suborder: Polyphaga
- Infraorder: Cucujiformia
- Family: Chrysomelidae
- Genus: Longitarsus
- Species: L. zangherii

Binomial name
- Longitarsus zangherii Warchałowskii, 1968

= Longitarsus zangherii =

Species of beetle

Longitarsus zangherii is a species of beetle in the subfamily Galerucinae. It has been found in Romagna, Italy.
