= Longitarsus ibericus =

Scientific classification
- Kingdom: Animalia
- Phylum: Arthropoda
- Clade: Pancrustacea
- Class: Insecta
- Order: Coleoptera
- Suborder: Polyphaga
- Infraorder: Cucujiformia
- Family: Chrysomelidae
- Genus: Longitarsus
- Species: L. ibericus

Binomial name
- Longitarsus ibericus Leonardi & Mohr 1974

Species of beetle

Longitarsus ibericus is a species of beetle in the subfamily Galerucinae that is endemic to Spain.
