= Longitarsus ferrugineus =

Scientific classification
- Kingdom: Animalia
- Phylum: Arthropoda
- Clade: Pancrustacea
- Class: Insecta
- Order: Coleoptera
- Suborder: Polyphaga
- Infraorder: Cucujiformia
- Family: Chrysomelidae
- Genus: Longitarsus
- Species: L. ferrugineus

Binomial name
- Longitarsus ferrugineus (Foudras, 1860)

Synonyms
- Teinodactyla ferrugineus Foudras, 1860

Species of beetle

Longitarsus ferrugineus is a species of black coloured beetle in the subfamily Galerucinae that can be found in Austria, Belarus, Benelux, Croatia, Czech Republic, Great Britain, Germany, Italy (including the island of Sardinia), Latvia, Lithuania, Slovakia, Slovenia, Spain, Switzerland, and in Northern Europe (except for Finland, Norway, Portugal, and Russia).
