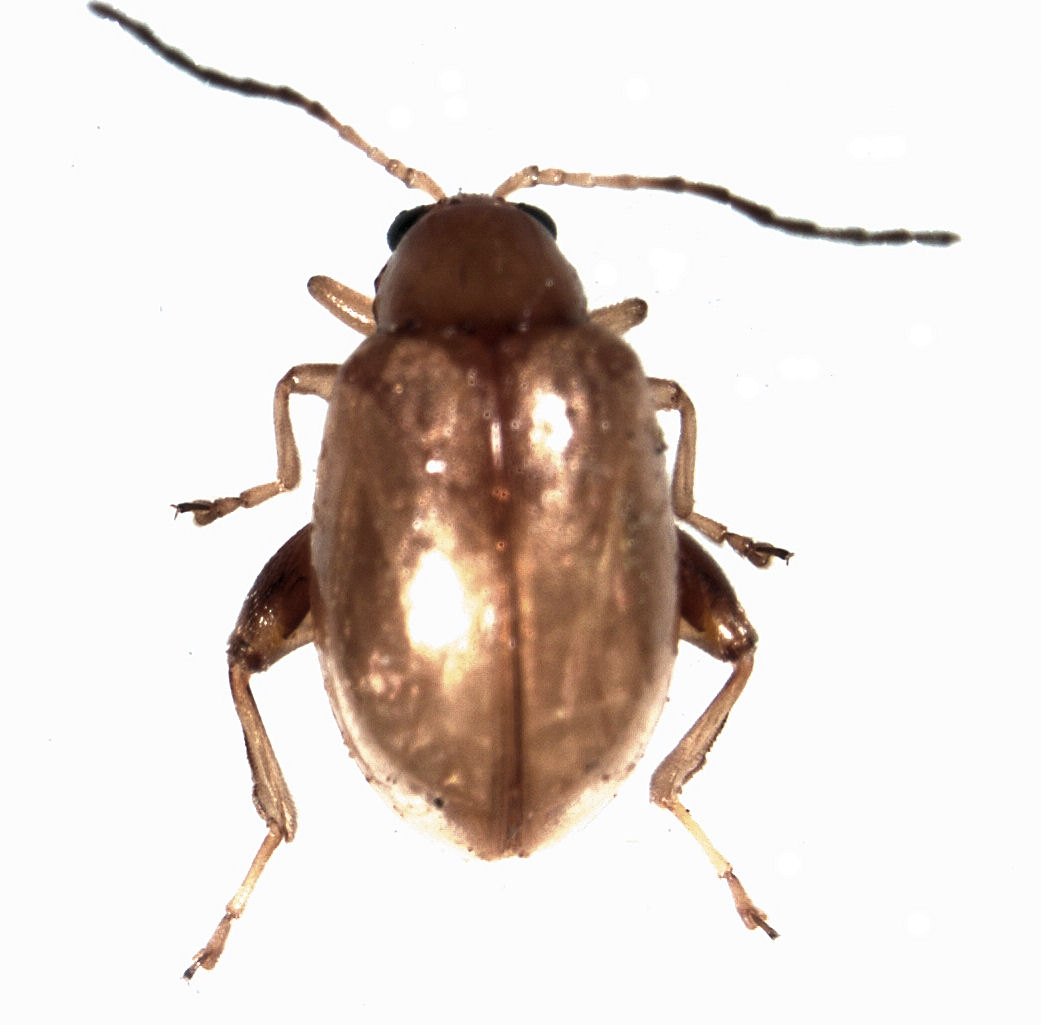

Scientific classification
- Kingdom: Animalia
- Phylum: Arthropoda
- Clade: Pancrustacea
- Class: Insecta
- Order: Coleoptera
- Suborder: Polyphaga
- Infraorder: Cucujiformia
- Family: Chrysomelidae
- Genus: Longitarsus
- Species: L. jacobaeae

Binomial name
- Longitarsus jacobaeae Waterhouse, 1858

= Tansy ragwort flea beetle =

Species of beetle

Longitarsus jacobaeae is a species of flea beetle known as the tansy ragwort flea beetle. It is used as an agent of biological pest control against the nectar-rich noxious weed known as ragwort (Senecio jacobaea reclassified as Jacobaea vulgaris).

The adult beetle is light golden brown in color and between 2 millimetres (0.079 in) and 4 millimetres (0.16 in) long. The female is larger than the male, especially when gravid. The beetle has enlarged femurs for its main locomotion method of hopping. The female lays eggs on or near the ragwort, its host plant. The larva emerges in about two weeks and burrows into the ground to feed on the roots. The larvae and adults are dually responsible for damage to the plant. The adult defoliates plants which are often already weakened by larval damage at the roots. This two-pronged attack is quite successful in preventing ragwort growth and development. The beetles have prevented entire populations of ragwort from reaching flowering stage at several monitored sites.

The beetle is not choosy between species in the genera in which it feeds from, and recent studies with the beetle have shown "that selection pressure by specialist herbivores is not likely a driving force in evolutionary diversification" of the plants which contain the alkaloids that the beetle dines on.

This beetle is native to Eurasia. It was first introduced to the United States as a ragwort biocontrol agent in 1969 and it is now established in much of the western United States.

The beetle is most effective when used in conjunction with the cinnabar moth (Tyria jacobaeae), another ragwort biocontrol agent. The beetle is not known to attack other plants. A close relative, Longitarsus ganglbaueri, which also feeds on ragwort, does attack other plant species; it is not used as a biocontrol agent for this reason.
