= Derocrepis erythropus =

Scientific classification
- Kingdom: Animalia
- Phylum: Arthropoda
- Class: Insecta
- Order: Coleoptera
- Suborder: Polyphaga
- Infraorder: Cucujiformia
- Family: Chrysomelidae
- Genus: Derocrepis
- Species: D. erythropus

Binomial name
- Derocrepis erythropus (F. E. Melsheimer, 1847)

Species of beetle

Derocrepis erythropus, the red-legged flea beetle, is a species of flea beetle in the family Chrysomelidae. It is found in North America.
