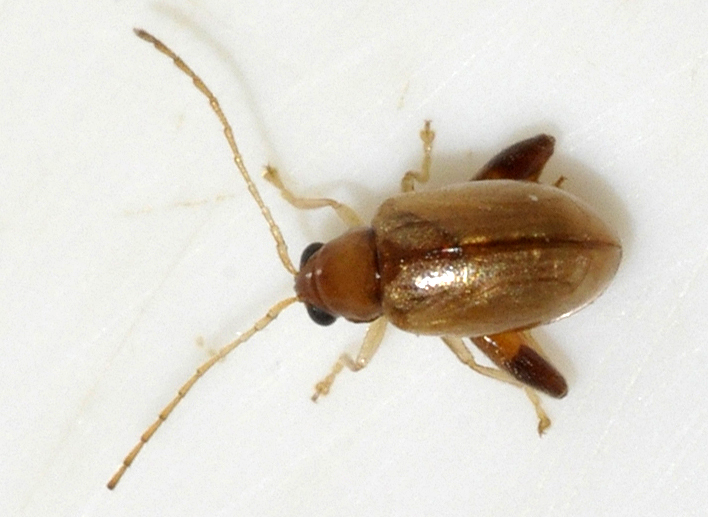

Scientific classification
- Kingdom: Animalia
- Phylum: Arthropoda
- Clade: Pancrustacea
- Class: Insecta
- Order: Coleoptera
- Suborder: Polyphaga
- Infraorder: Cucujiformia
- Family: Chrysomelidae
- Genus: Longitarsus
- Species: L. exsoletus

Binomial name
- Longitarsus exsoletus (Linnaeus, 1758)

= Longitarsus exsoletus =

Species of beetle

Longitarsus exsoletus is a species of beetle in the subfamily Galerucinae that can be found everywhere in Europe (except for North Macedonia) and in Central Russia.
