= Longitarsus linnaei =

Scientific classification
- Kingdom: Animalia
- Phylum: Arthropoda
- Clade: Pancrustacea
- Class: Insecta
- Order: Coleoptera
- Suborder: Polyphaga
- Infraorder: Cucujiformia
- Family: Chrysomelidae
- Genus: Longitarsus
- Species: L. linnaei

Binomial name
- Longitarsus linnaei (Duftschmid, 1825)

Synonyms
- Haltica linnaei Duftschmid, 1825

Species of beetle

Longitarsus linnaei is a species of beetle of the Chrysomelidae family and the subfamily Galerucinae. It is distributed in the southern part of France, southern Central Europe, Italy and the Balkan Peninsula (with the exception of the southern part of Greece), the Caucasus, Asia Minor, Israel, Palestine, north-eastern Algeria and Tunisia.

== Variety ==
- Longitarsus linnaei var. amoenus Weise, 1888
- Longitarsus linnaei var. scrutator Weise, 1890
