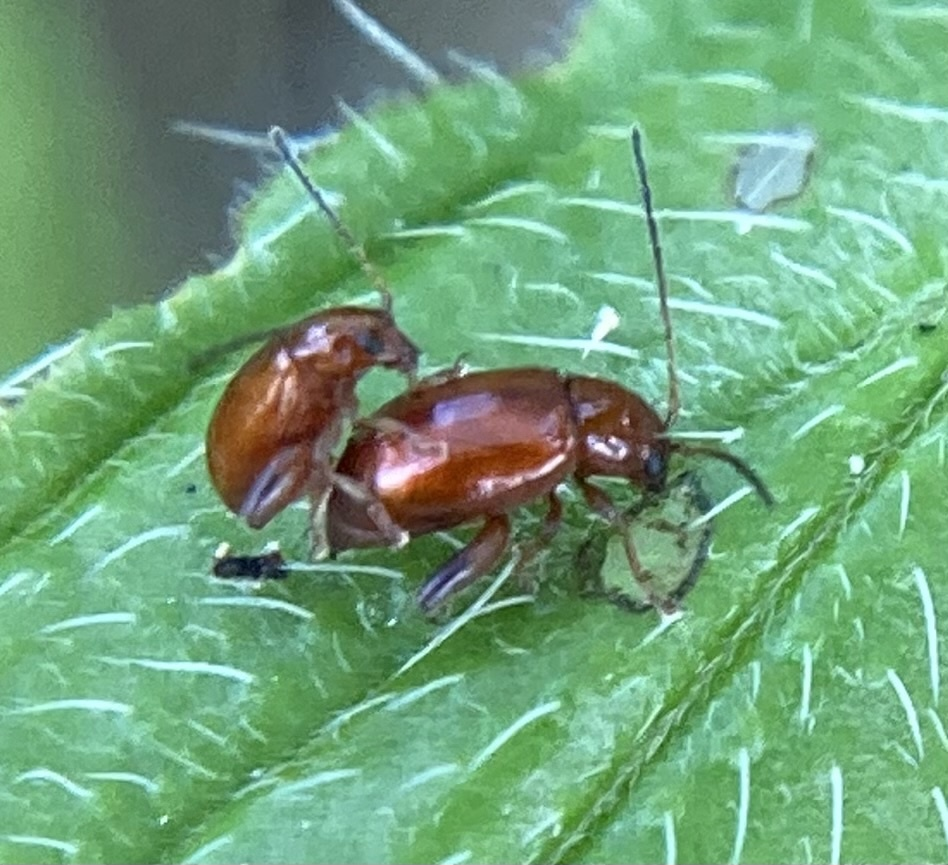
- Mating pair

Scientific classification
- Kingdom: Animalia
- Phylum: Arthropoda
- Clade: Pancrustacea
- Class: Insecta
- Order: Coleoptera
- Suborder: Polyphaga
- Infraorder: Cucujiformia
- Family: Chrysomelidae
- Genus: Longitarsus
- Species: L. subrufus

Binomial name
- Longitarsus subrufus J. L. LeConte, 1859

= Longitarsus subrufus =

Species of beetle

Longitarsus subrufus, the marbleseed flea beetle, is a species of flea beetle in the family Chrysomelidae. It is found in North America.
