= Longitarsus violentus =

Scientific classification
- Kingdom: Animalia
- Phylum: Arthropoda
- Clade: Pancrustacea
- Class: Insecta
- Order: Coleoptera
- Suborder: Polyphaga
- Infraorder: Cucujiformia
- Family: Chrysomelidae
- Genus: Longitarsus
- Species: L. violentus

Binomial name
- Longitarsus violentus Weise, 1893

Species of beetle

Longitarsus violentus is a species of beetle in the subfamily Galerucinae that can be found in Azerbaijan, Georgia, Russian territories such as Buriatia and Dagestan, and in West China.
