= Longitarsus aubozaorum =

Scientific classification
- Kingdom: Animalia
- Phylum: Arthropoda
- Clade: Pancrustacea
- Class: Insecta
- Order: Coleoptera
- Suborder: Polyphaga
- Infraorder: Cucujiformia
- Family: Chrysomelidae
- Genus: Longitarsus
- Species: L. aubozaorum

Binomial name
- Longitarsus aubozaorum Biondi, 1997

Species of beetle

Longitarsus aubozaorum is a species of beetle in the subfamily Galerucinae that is endemic to Turkey.
