= Longitarsus andalusicus =

Scientific classification
- Kingdom: Animalia
- Phylum: Arthropoda
- Clade: Pancrustacea
- Class: Insecta
- Order: Coleoptera
- Suborder: Polyphaga
- Infraorder: Cucujiformia
- Family: Chrysomelidae
- Genus: Longitarsus
- Species: L. andalusicus

Binomial name
- Longitarsus andalusicus Gruev, 1973

Species of beetle

Longitarsus andalusicus is a species of beetle from the Chrysomelidae family that is endemic to Andalusia, Spain, from which it takes its name.
