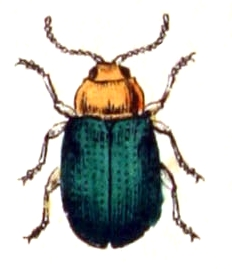
- Derocrepis rufipes

Scientific classification
- Kingdom: Animalia
- Phylum: Arthropoda
- Class: Insecta
- Order: Coleoptera
- Suborder: Polyphaga
- Infraorder: Cucujiformia
- Family: Chrysomelidae
- Subfamily: Galerucinae
- Tribe: Alticini
- Genus: Derocrepis; Weise, 1886

= Derocrepis =

Genus of beetles

Derocrepis is a genus of flea beetles in the family Chrysomelidae. There are seven described species in Derocrepis.

== Selected species ==
- Derocrepis aesculi (Dury, 1906)
- Derocrepis carinata (Linell, 1897)
- Derocrepis erythropus (F. E. Melsheimer, 1847) (red-legged flea beetle)
- Derocrepis oregoni Hatch, 1971
- Derocrepis rufipes (Linnaeus, 1758)
