= Longitarsus violentoides =

Scientific classification
- Kingdom: Animalia
- Phylum: Arthropoda
- Clade: Pancrustacea
- Class: Insecta
- Order: Coleoptera
- Suborder: Polyphaga
- Infraorder: Cucujiformia
- Family: Chrysomelidae
- Genus: Longitarsus
- Species: L. violentoides

Binomial name
- Longitarsus violentoides Konstantinov, 2000

Species of beetle

Longitarsus violentoides is a species of beetle in the subfamily Galerucinae that is endemic to Armenia.
