= Longitarsus weisei =

Scientific classification
- Kingdom: Animalia
- Phylum: Arthropoda
- Clade: Pancrustacea
- Class: Insecta
- Order: Coleoptera
- Suborder: Polyphaga
- Infraorder: Cucujiformia
- Family: Chrysomelidae
- Genus: Longitarsus
- Species: L. weisei

Binomial name
- Longitarsus weisei Guillbebeau, 1895

Synonyms
- Longitarsus fuscoaeneus var. maassi Hubenthal, 1898

Species of beetle

Longitarsus weisei is a species of beetle from Chrysomelidae family.

== Distribution ==
The species can be found in Europe, including countries like Albania, France, Germany, Spain, Switzerland, the Netherlands, and South Poland. It can also be found in Asia, including Afghanistan, Iraq, Iran, Tajikistan, Turkey, and West China. And in the Asian part of Russia, in Siberia, or more precisely, Yakutsk.
