= Longitarsus artvinus =

Scientific classification
- Kingdom: Animalia
- Phylum: Arthropoda
- Clade: Pancrustacea
- Class: Insecta
- Order: Coleoptera
- Suborder: Polyphaga
- Infraorder: Cucujiformia
- Family: Chrysomelidae
- Genus: Longitarsus
- Species: L. artvinus

Binomial name
- Longitarsus artvinus Gruev & Aslan, 1998

Species of beetle

Longitarsus artvinus is a species of beetle in the subfamily Galerucinae that is endemic to Turkey.
