= Longitarsus agilis =

Scientific classification
- Kingdom: Animalia
- Phylum: Arthropoda
- Clade: Pancrustacea
- Class: Insecta
- Order: Coleoptera
- Suborder: Polyphaga
- Infraorder: Cucujiformia
- Family: Chrysomelidae
- Genus: Longitarsus
- Species: L. agilis

Binomial name
- Longitarsus agilis (Rye, 1868)

Species of beetle

Longitarsus agilis is a species of beetle from the Chrysomelidae family that can be found in Belgium, Germany, Great Britain, France, and the Netherlands.
