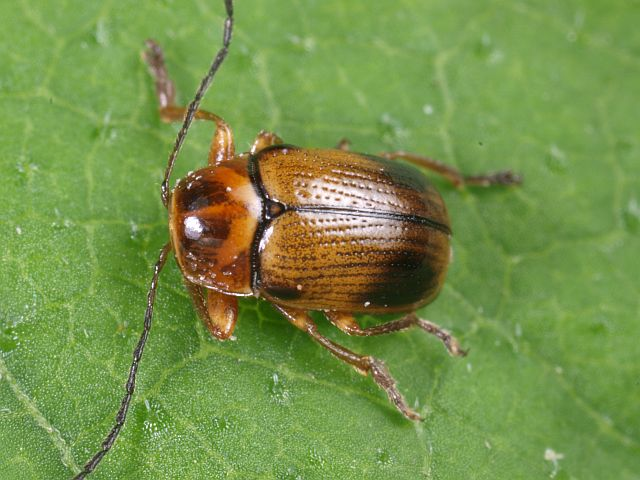

Scientific classification
- Kingdom: Animalia
- Phylum: Arthropoda
- Clade: Pancrustacea
- Class: Insecta
- Order: Coleoptera
- Suborder: Polyphaga
- Infraorder: Cucujiformia
- Family: Chrysomelidae
- Genus: Cryptocephalus
- Species: C. pusillus

Binomial name
- Cryptocephalus pusillus Fabricius, 1777

= Cryptocephalus pusillus =

Species of beetle

Cryptocephalus pusillus is a species of leaf beetle native to Europe.
