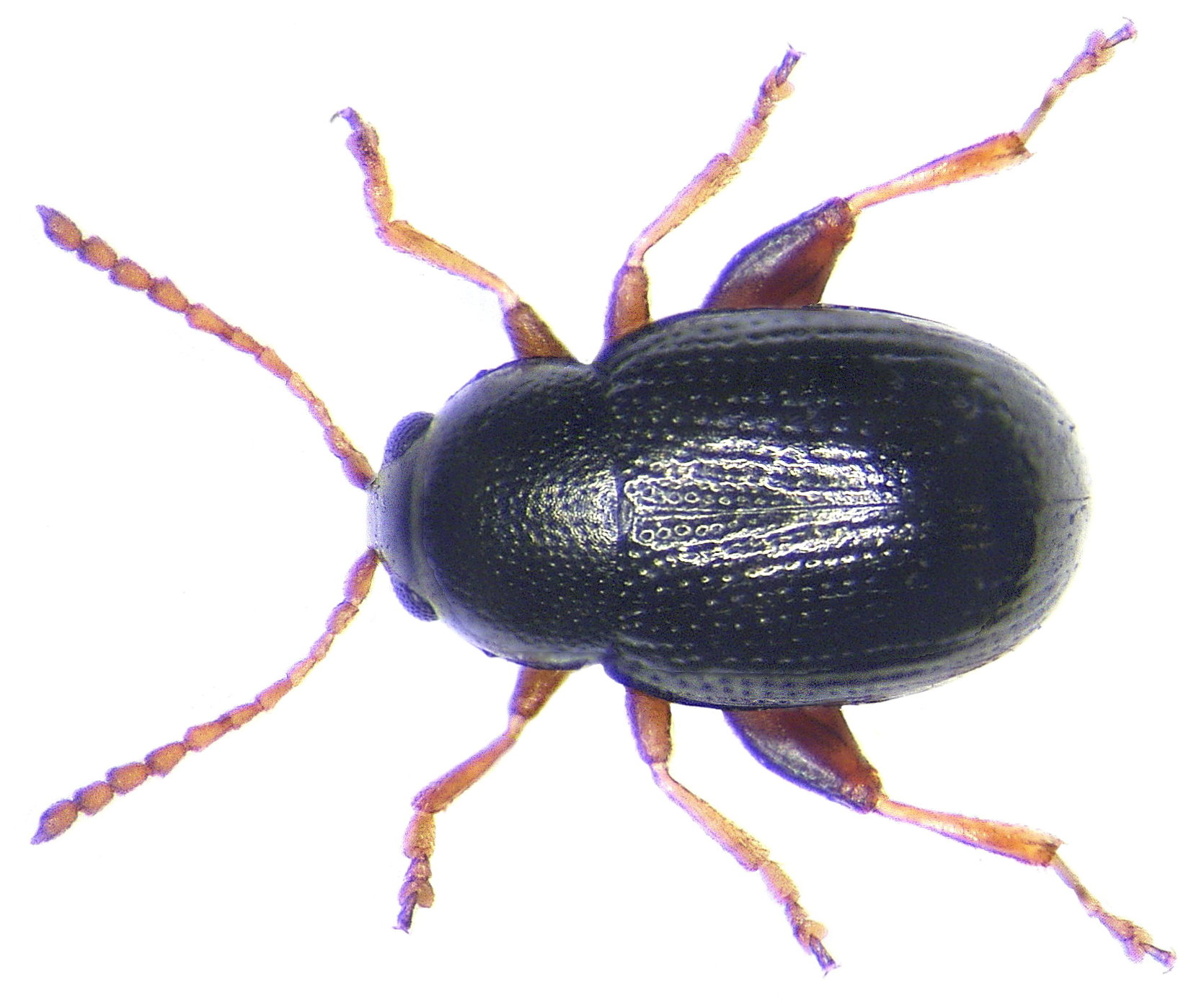

Scientific classification
- Kingdom: Animalia
- Phylum: Arthropoda
- Class: Insecta
- Order: Coleoptera
- Suborder: Polyphaga
- Infraorder: Cucujiformia
- Family: Chrysomelidae
- Genus: Batophila
- Species: B. rubi

Binomial name
- Batophila rubi Paykull, 1799

= Batophila rubi =

Species of beetle

Batophila rubi video

Batophila rubi is a species of leaf beetle native to Europe.
