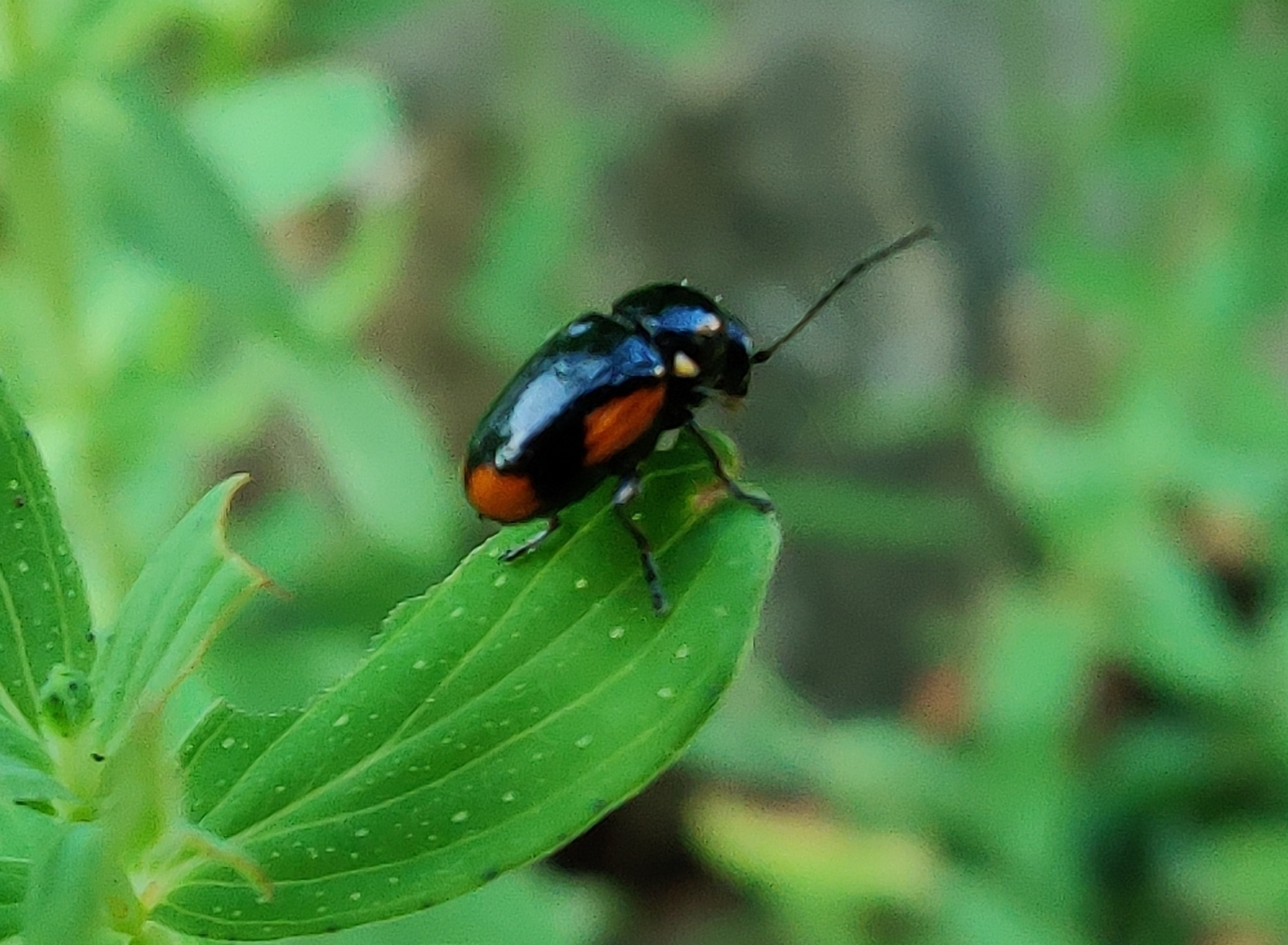

Scientific classification
- Kingdom: Animalia
- Phylum: Arthropoda
- Clade: Pancrustacea
- Class: Insecta
- Order: Coleoptera
- Suborder: Polyphaga
- Infraorder: Cucujiformia
- Family: Chrysomelidae
- Genus: Cryptocephalus
- Species: C. moraei

Binomial name
- Cryptocephalus moraei (Linnaeus, 1758)

= Cryptocephalus moraei =

Species of beetle

Cryptocephalus moraei is a species of beetle from the genus Cryptocephalus. The species was originally described by Carl Linnaeus in 1758.

== Description ==
This leaf beetle is 3 to 5 mm in size. The front parts of the antenna are bicoloured black-brown, but turns fully black. The head of the males are yellow, while the females have a black head with two yellow dots. The Prothorax is black with a yellow smudge against the rear corners. The Elytra contain rows with robust points, mostly black but again with a yellow stain at the end. The legs are reddish-brown. The species can be observed from May to August and feeds on species from the Hypericum genus.

== Range ==
Cryptocephalus moraei has been recorded across Europe, both in scholarly articles and citizen science efforts.
