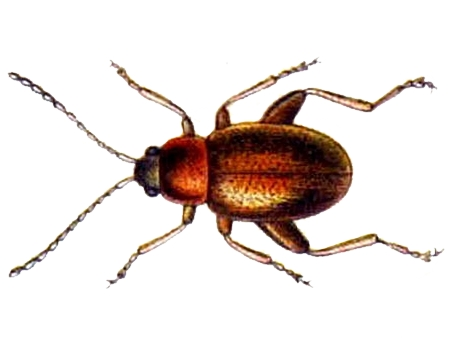

Scientific classification
- Kingdom: Animalia
- Phylum: Arthropoda
- Clade: Pancrustacea
- Class: Insecta
- Order: Coleoptera
- Suborder: Polyphaga
- Infraorder: Cucujiformia
- Family: Chrysomelidae
- Genus: Longitarsus
- Species: L. luridus

Binomial name
- Longitarsus luridus (Scopoli, 1763)

Synonyms
- Chrysomela luridus Scopoli, 1763

= Longitarsus luridus =

Species of beetle

Longitarsus luridus is a species of beetle from the Chrysomelidae family that can be found everywhere in Europe (except Portugal).
