= Longitarsus gracilis =

Scientific classification
- Kingdom: Animalia
- Phylum: Arthropoda
- Clade: Pancrustacea
- Class: Insecta
- Order: Coleoptera
- Suborder: Polyphaga
- Infraorder: Cucujiformia
- Family: Chrysomelidae
- Genus: Longitarsus
- Species: L. gracilis

Binomial name
- Longitarsus gracilis Kutschera, 1864

Synonyms
- Longitarsus sagittifer Mohr, 1962

Species of beetle

Longitarsus gracilis is a species of beetle in the subfamily Galerucinae that can be found in Asian countries like Turkey and Israel, and also in African ones such as Algeria and Morocco. Besides African and Asian countries it is widespread in Europe. It can be found in Central Europe (except for Romania), Yugoslavian states (except for North Macedonia), Baltic states, and Ukraine.
