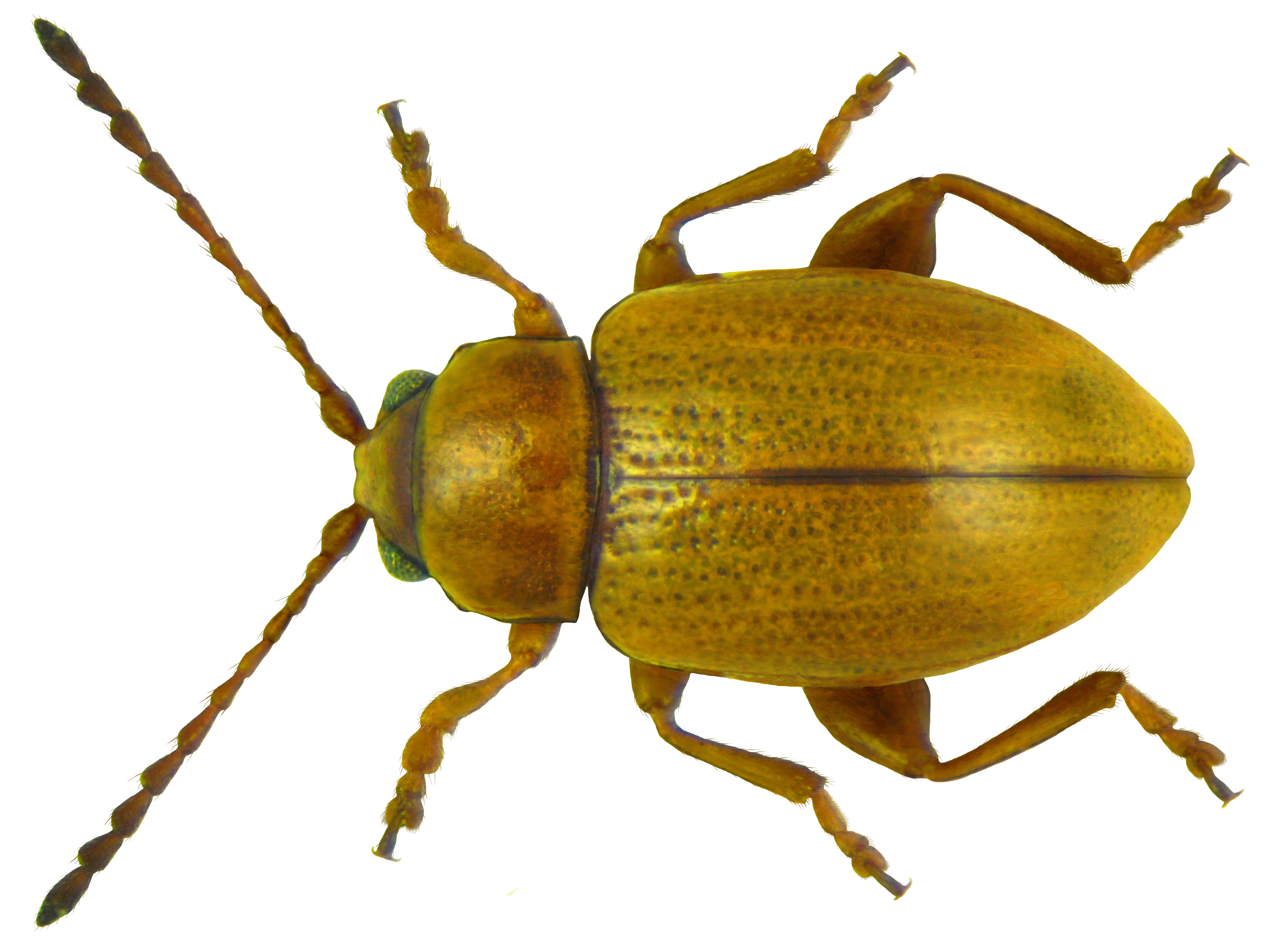
- Lythraria salicariae 2,2 mm

Scientific classification
- Kingdom: Animalia
- Phylum: Arthropoda
- Clade: Pancrustacea
- Class: Insecta
- Order: Coleoptera
- Suborder: Polyphaga
- Infraorder: Cucujiformia
- Family: Chrysomelidae
- Genus: Lythraria
- Species: L. salicariae

Binomial name
- Lythraria salicariae (Paykull, 1800)

= Lythraria salicariae =

Species of beetle

Lythraria salicariae (loosestrife flea beetle) is a species of Chrysomelidae family, that is common in the Palaearctic realm east to Korea.
