= Longitarsus curtus =

Scientific classification
- Kingdom: Animalia
- Phylum: Arthropoda
- Clade: Pancrustacea
- Class: Insecta
- Order: Coleoptera
- Suborder: Polyphaga
- Infraorder: Cucujiformia
- Family: Chrysomelidae
- Genus: Longitarsus
- Species: L. curtus

Binomial name
- Longitarsus curtus (Allard, 1860)

Species of beetle

Longitarsus curtus is a species of leaf beetle in the subfamily Galerucinae that can be found everywhere in Europe (except for Liechtenstein, Norway, Switzerland, Portugal and the island of Sardinia). It was first described by entomologist Ernest Allard in 1860.
