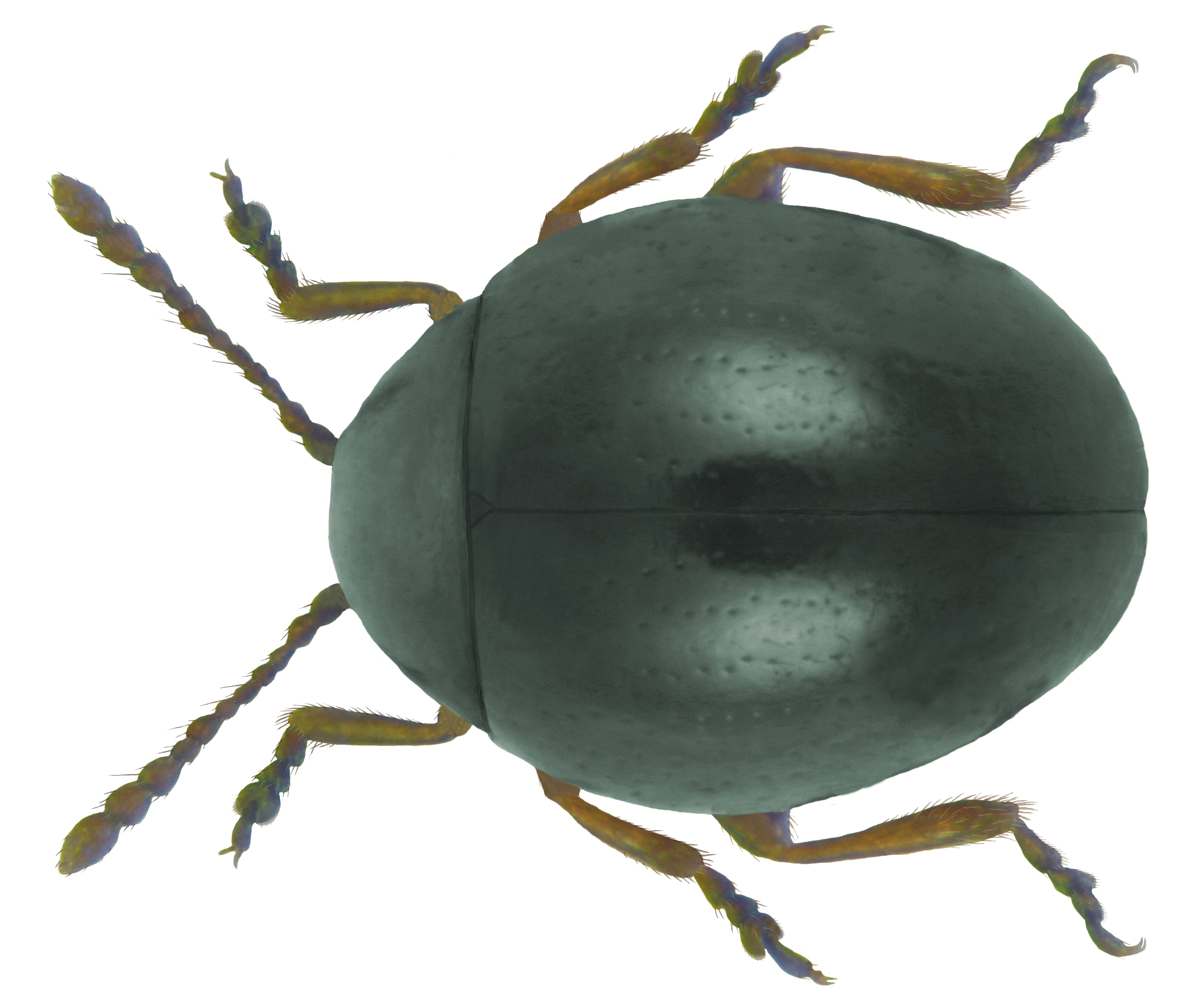
- Mniophila muscorum 1-1.5 mm

Scientific classification
- Kingdom: Animalia
- Phylum: Arthropoda
- Clade: Pancrustacea
- Class: Insecta
- Order: Coleoptera
- Suborder: Polyphaga
- Infraorder: Cucujiformia
- Family: Chrysomelidae
- Genus: Mniophila
- Species: M. muscorum

Binomial name
- Mniophila muscorum (Koch, 1803)

= Mniophila muscorum =

Species of beetle

Mniophila muscorum is a species of leaf beetle in the subfamily Galerucinae, that can be found nearly everywhere in Southern Northern Europe, Central Europe and Eastern Europe and also in Italy it is not recorded in Turkey or the Caucasus and it is doubtfully recorded in Spain.
