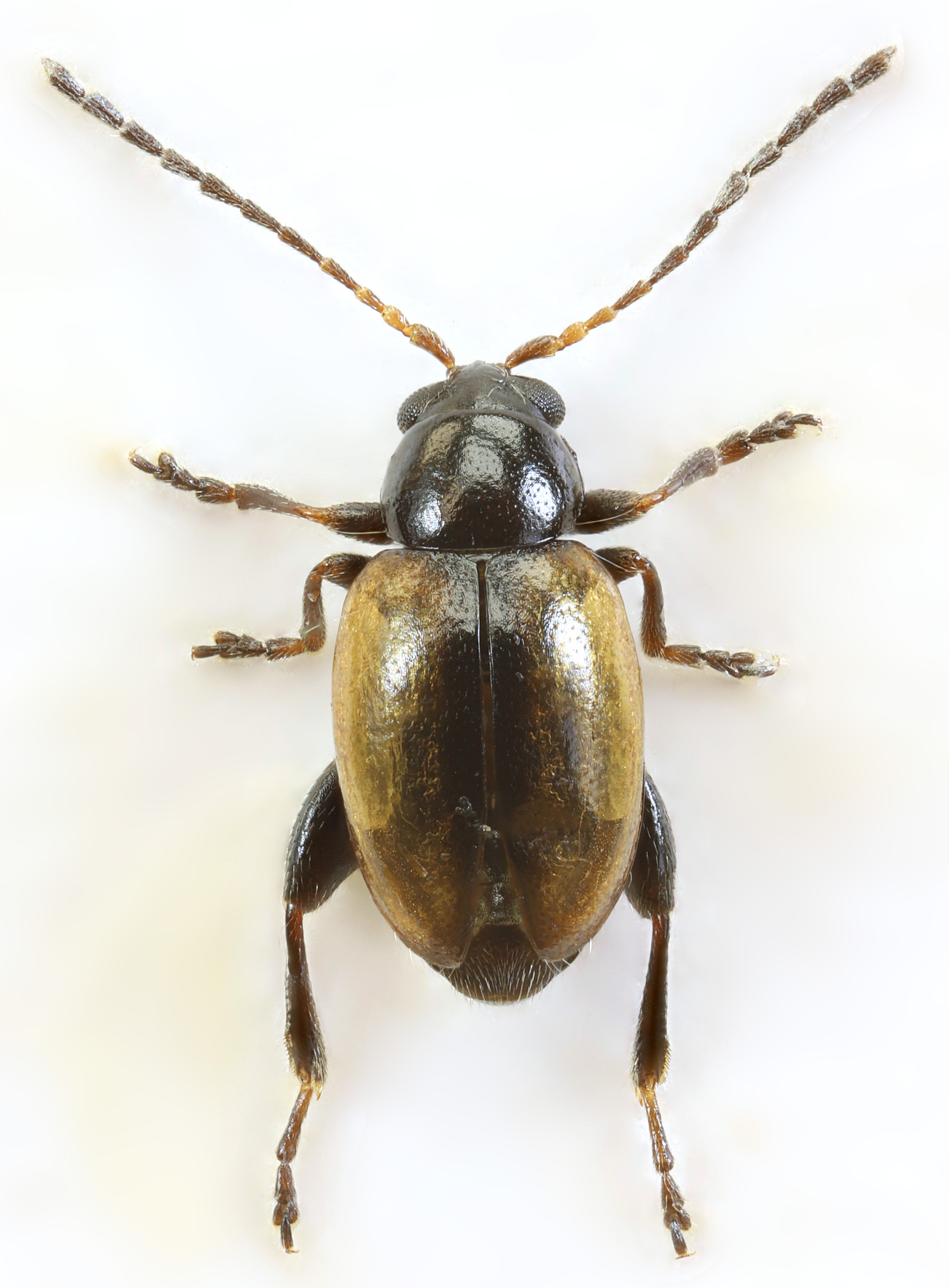

Scientific classification
- Kingdom: Animalia
- Phylum: Arthropoda
- Clade: Pancrustacea
- Class: Insecta
- Order: Coleoptera
- Suborder: Polyphaga
- Infraorder: Cucujiformia
- Family: Chrysomelidae
- Genus: Longitarsus
- Species: L. suturellus

Binomial name
- Longitarsus suturellus Duftschmid, 1825

Synonyms
- Thyamis thorarica Allard, 1860

= Longitarsus suturellus =

Species of beetle

Longitarsus suturellus is a species of beetle in the subfamily Galerucinae. It is distributed in the Palearctic realm from the Pyrenees to Japan. Adult beetles and larvae feed on the leaves of sage (Senecio) (Asteraceae).

== Forms and varieties ==
- Variety: Longitarsus suturellus var. paludosus (Weise, 1893)
- Variety: Longitarsus suturellus var. macer (Weise, 1895)
- Form: Longitarsus suturellus f. limbalis (Kolbe, 1920)
- Form: Longitarsus suturellus f. testis (Kolbe, 1920)
