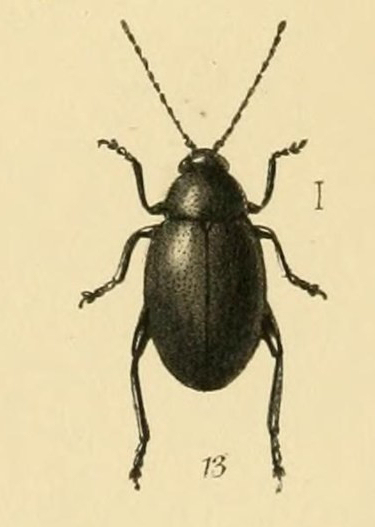

Scientific classification
- Domain: Eukaryota
- Kingdom: Animalia
- Phylum: Arthropoda
- Class: Insecta
- Order: Coleoptera
- Suborder: Polyphaga
- Infraorder: Cucujiformia
- Family: Chrysomelidae
- Genus: Longitarsus
- Species: L. nigerrimus

Binomial name
- Longitarsus nigerrimus (Gyllenhal, 1827)

= Bladderwort flea beetle =

Species of beetle

Longitarsus nigerrimus (also known as bladderwort flea-beetle) is a greenish-black coloured species of beetle in the tribe Alticini that can be found in European countries such Austria, Czech Republic, France, Germany, Great Britain, Hungary, Italy, Poland, Slovenia, Switzerland, Benelux, Yugoslavian states (except for Macedonia), Baltic states, Scandinavia, and in Eastern Europe (Belarus and Ukraine). It can also be found in North Russia, specifically in Siberia and east to Amur.

== Ecology ==
The species emerge in midsummer to mate and lay eggs. After they lay their eggs they die, living their young to feed on such plants as Utricularia minor and other Utricularia species. They feed on them till adulthood, and then go to overwinter. They grow up to 1.5–2 millimetres (0.059–0.079 in) long, with females being the largest.

== Habitat ==
They overwinter in Sphagnum moss, which can be found wet boggy areas.

== Behavior ==
This type of species can swim, which is rarity for its kind. When the moss goes underwater they use their front legs for breaststroke like movements to stay afloat. However, they cannot do this when they are underwater.
