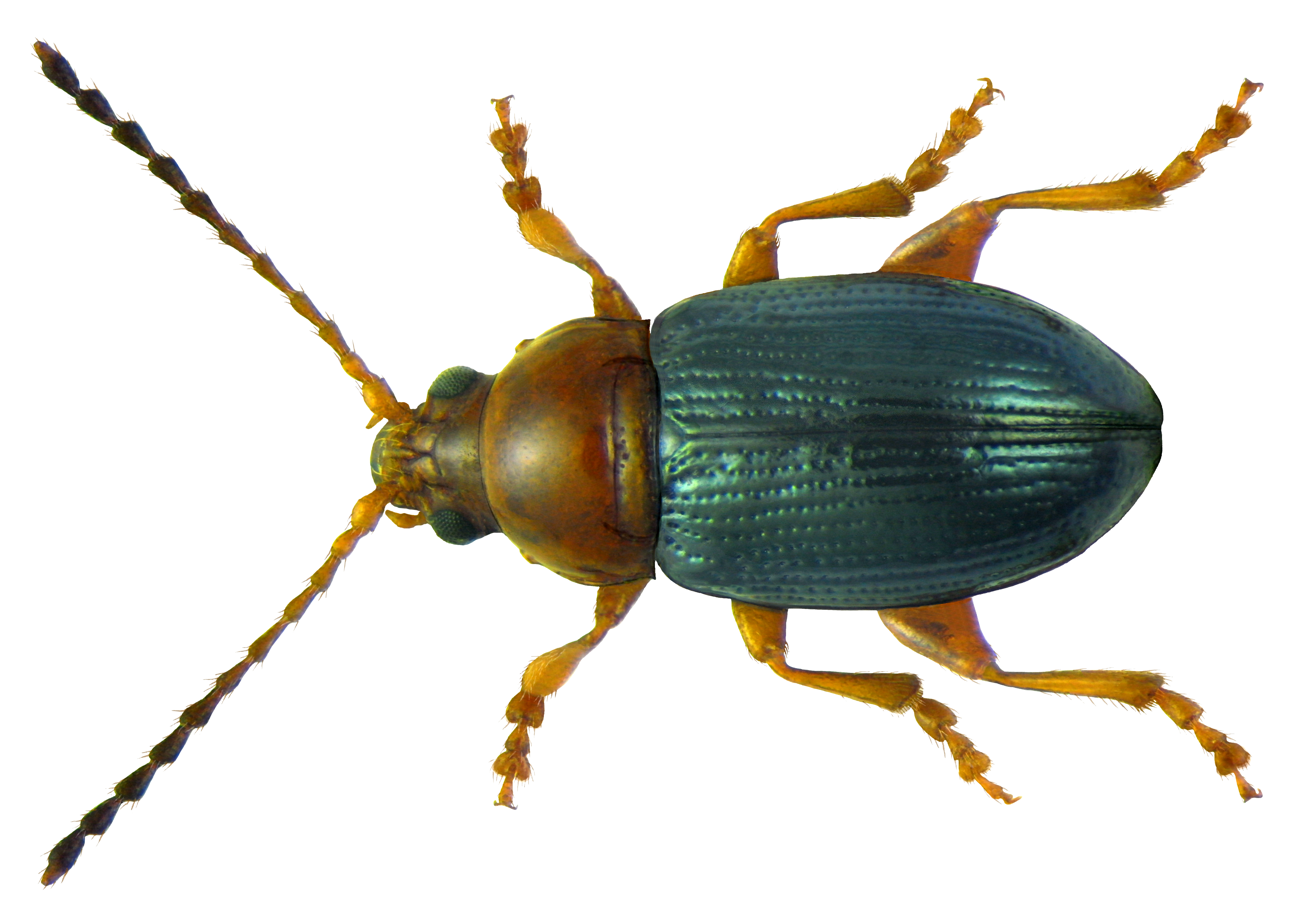
- Derocrepis rufipes 2.8 to 3.8 mm

Scientific classification
- Kingdom: Animalia
- Phylum: Arthropoda
- Class: Insecta
- Order: Coleoptera
- Suborder: Polyphaga
- Infraorder: Cucujiformia
- Family: Chrysomelidae
- Genus: Derocrepis
- Species: D. rufipes

Binomial name
- Derocrepis rufipes (Linnaeus, 1758)

= Derocrepis rufipes =

Species of beetle

Derocrepis rufipes is a species of leaf beetle native to Europe.
