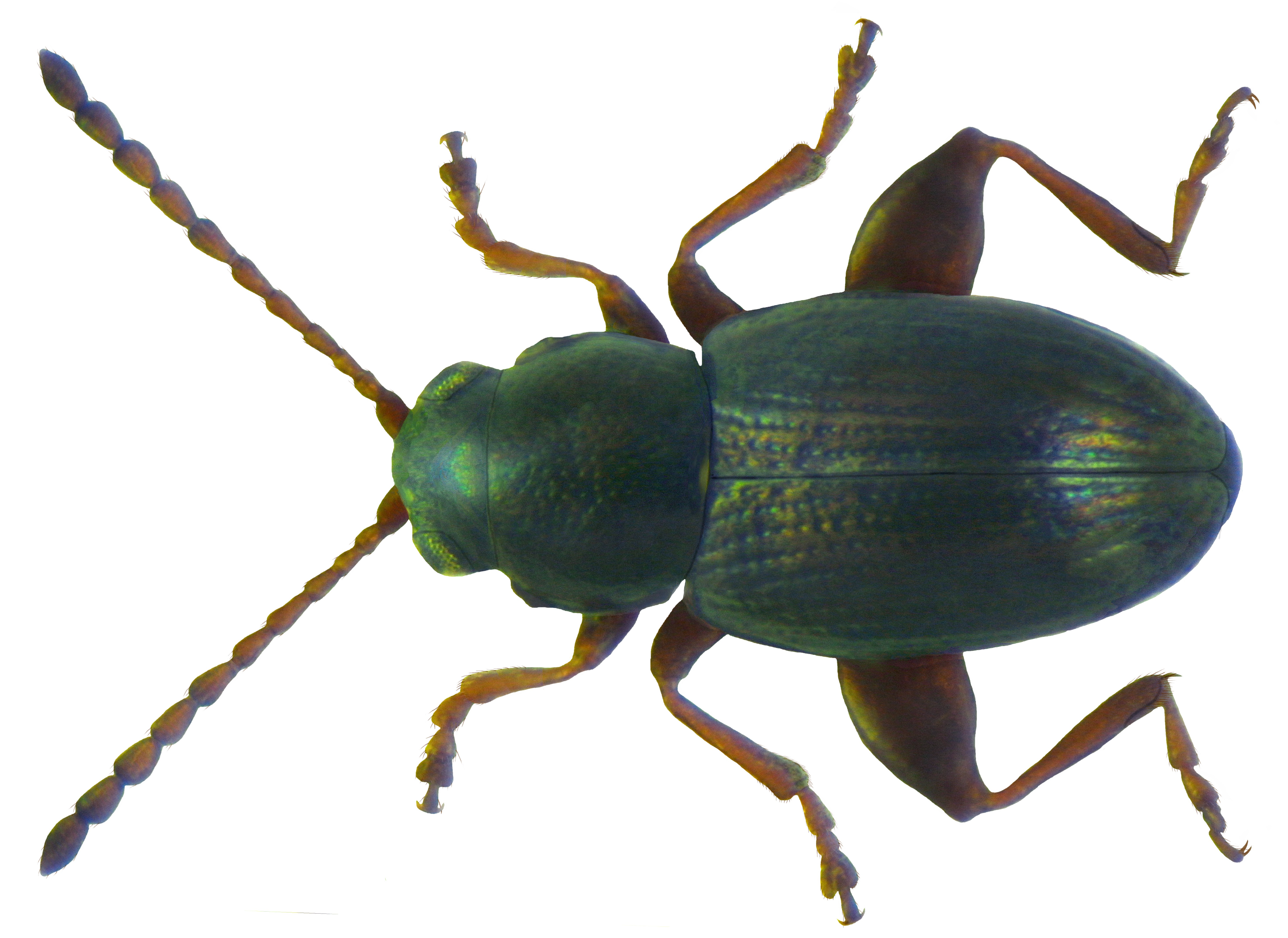

Scientific classification
- Domain: Eukaryota
- Kingdom: Animalia
- Phylum: Arthropoda
- Class: Insecta
- Order: Coleoptera
- Suborder: Polyphaga
- Infraorder: Cucujiformia
- Family: Chrysomelidae
- Genus: Batophila
- Species: B. aerata

Binomial name
- Batophila aerata (Marsham, 1802)

= Batophila aerata =

Species of beetle

Batophila aerata is a species of Chrysomelidae family, that is common in South England, France, Corsica, Germany, Italy, Slovenia, Greece, Spain, Algeria, Morocco, Tunisia. That can be found in islands such as Sardinia and Sicily.
