= Longitarsus succineus =

Scientific classification
- Kingdom: Animalia
- Phylum: Arthropoda
- Clade: Pancrustacea
- Class: Insecta
- Order: Coleoptera
- Suborder: Polyphaga
- Infraorder: Cucujiformia
- Family: Chrysomelidae
- Genus: Longitarsus
- Species: L. succineus

Binomial name
- Longitarsus succineus (Foudras in Mulsant, 1859)

Species of beetle

Longitarsus succineus is a species of flea beetle in the family Chrysomelidae. It is found in North America and Europe.
