= Longitarsus aeneicollis =

Scientific classification
- Kingdom: Animalia
- Phylum: Arthropoda
- Clade: Pancrustacea
- Class: Insecta
- Order: Coleoptera
- Suborder: Polyphaga
- Infraorder: Cucujiformia
- Family: Chrysomelidae
- Genus: Longitarsus
- Species: L. aeneicollis

Binomial name
- Longitarsus aeneicollis (Faldermann, 1837)

Species of beetle

Longitarsus aeneicollis is a species of beetle in the flea beetle subfamily that can be found everywhere in Europe (except for Albania, Iceland, Ireland, Estonia, Finland, Liechtenstein, Norway, and Slovenia).
