= Longitarsus longiseta =

Scientific classification
- Kingdom: Animalia
- Phylum: Arthropoda
- Clade: Pancrustacea
- Class: Insecta
- Order: Coleoptera
- Suborder: Polyphaga
- Infraorder: Cucujiformia
- Family: Chrysomelidae
- Genus: Longitarsus
- Species: L. longiseta

Binomial name
- Longitarsus longiseta Weise, 1889

Synonyms
- Longitarsus clarus Allen, 1967

Species of beetle

Longitarsus longiseta is a species of beetle in the subfamily Galerucinae that can be found everywhere in European countries such as Austria, the Baltic states, Benelux, Great Britain, Germany, Hungary, Italy, Liechtenstein, Poland, Romania, Russia, Slovakia, Slovenia, Spain, Switzerland, and Scandinavia (except for Denmark).
