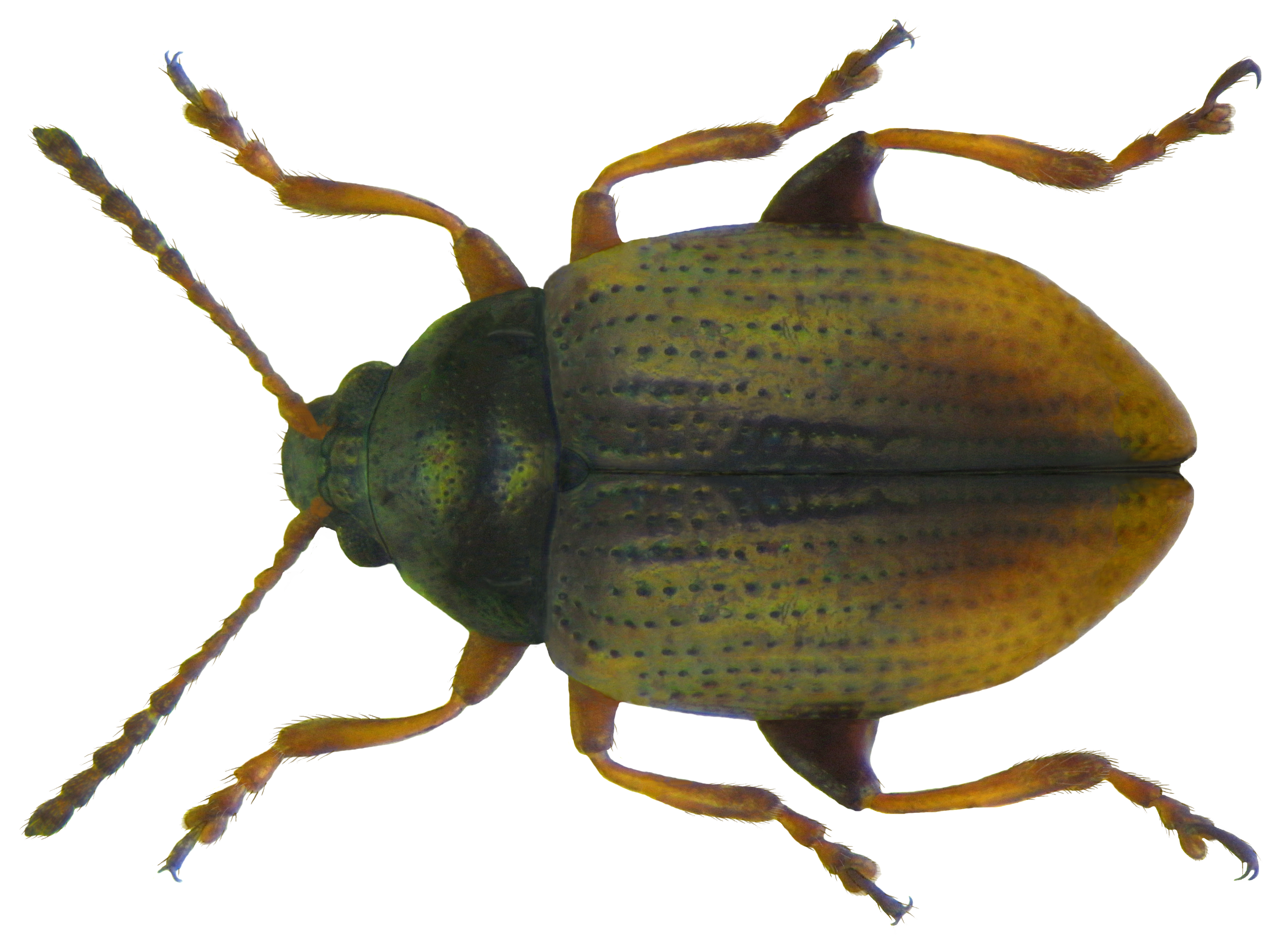
- Hippuriphila modeeri 2-2,5 mm

Scientific classification
- Kingdom: Animalia
- Phylum: Arthropoda
- Class: Insecta
- Order: Coleoptera
- Suborder: Polyphaga
- Infraorder: Cucujiformia
- Family: Chrysomelidae
- Genus: Hippuriphila
- Species: H. modeeri

Binomial name
- Hippuriphila modeeri (Linnaeus, 1761)

Synonyms
- Chrysomela modeeri Linnaeus, 1761; Haltica chrysopygis Beck, 1817; Crepidodera mancula Leconte, 1861; Hippuriphila modeeri v. bimaculata Weise, 1886; Hippuriphila modeeri v. chalybaea Weise, 1886; Hippuriphila modeeri v. praescutellaris Pic, 1909; Hippuriphila laevicollis Hellen, 1933; Hippuriphila modeeri ab. violaceovittata Csiki, 1953 (Unav.)

= Hippuriphila modeeri =

Species of beetle

Hippuriphila modeeri is a species of flea beetle in the family Chrysomelidae, found in both the Nearctic and Palearctic.
