= Longitarsus obliteratus =

Scientific classification
- Kingdom: Animalia
- Phylum: Arthropoda
- Clade: Pancrustacea
- Class: Insecta
- Order: Coleoptera
- Suborder: Polyphaga
- Infraorder: Cucujiformia
- Family: Chrysomelidae
- Genus: Longitarsus
- Species: L. obliteratus

Binomial name
- Longitarsus obliteratus (Rosenhauer, 1847)

Synonyms
- Teinodactyla obliterata (Rosenhauer, 1847); Longitarsus consociatus (Förster, 1849)

Species of beetle

Longitarsus obliteratus is a species of beetle from Chrysomelidae family.

== Description ==
The species is green coloured, and has orange legs and antennae. The males are smaller than the females.

== Distribution ==
The species can be found in Europe, including Southern England and North Poland. It can also be found in Asia, including Asia Minor, the Caucasus, the Middle East, Afghanistan and Iran.
