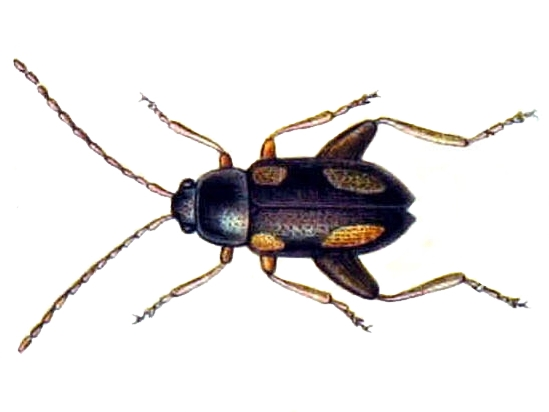

Scientific classification
- Kingdom: Animalia
- Phylum: Arthropoda
- Clade: Pancrustacea
- Class: Insecta
- Order: Coleoptera
- Suborder: Polyphaga
- Infraorder: Cucujiformia
- Family: Chrysomelidae
- Subfamily: Galerucinae
- Tribe: Alticini
- Genus: Longitarsus
- Species: L. quadriguttatus

Binomial name
- Longitarsus quadriguttatus (Pontopiddan, 1763)

Synonyms
- Chrysomela 4-guttata Pontopiddan, 1763; Altica 4 pustulata Fabricius, 1775; Altica quadripunctata Geoffroy, 1785; Altica quatuorpustulata Olivier, 1789; Altica quadrinotata Gmelin, 1790; Chrysomela cynoglossi Marsham, 1802; Haltica quadrimaculata Koch, 1803; Thyamis quadripunctulata Stephens, 1839

= Longitarsus quadriguttatus =

Species of beetle

Longitarsus quadriguttatus is a species of beetle in the leaf beetle family. It is distributed in Central and south-eastern Europe, Asia Minor and the Caucasus. Adults and larvae feed on the leaves of Boraginaceae species, as well as Cynoglossum officinale and Echium vulgare.

== Varieties ==
- Variety: Longitarsus quadriguttatus var. binotatus (Weise, 1888)
- Variety: Longitarsus quadriguttatus var. immaculatus (Weise, 1888)
- Variety: Longitarsus quadriguttatus var. vittatus (Weise, 1888)
