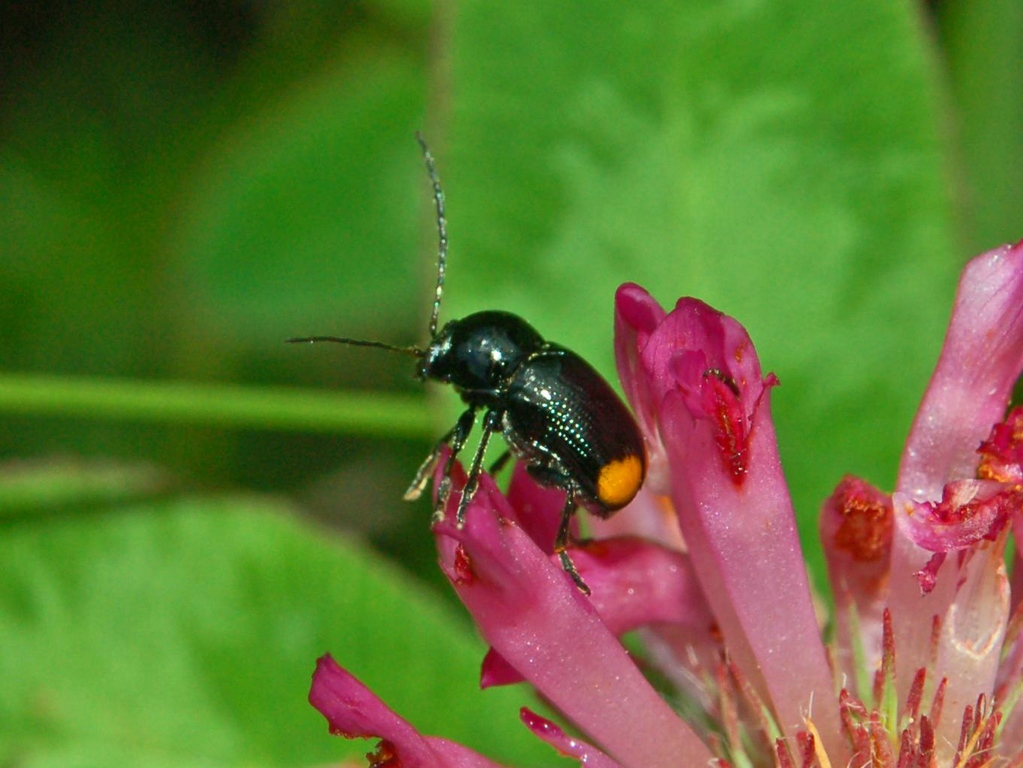

Scientific classification
- Domain: Eukaryota
- Kingdom: Animalia
- Phylum: Arthropoda
- Class: Insecta
- Order: Coleoptera
- Suborder: Polyphaga
- Infraorder: Cucujiformia
- Family: Chrysomelidae
- Genus: Cryptocephalus
- Species: C. biguttatus

Binomial name
- Cryptocephalus biguttatus (Scopoli, 1763)

Synonyms
- Cryptocephalus bipustulatus Fabricius, 1775

= Cryptocephalus biguttatus =

Species of beetle

Cryptocephalus biguttatus is a species of cylindrical leaf beetle belonging to the family Chrysomelidae, subfamily Cryptocephalinae.

The colour of head, pronotum and elytra is black, with two yellow spots on the apex.

Adult beetles live from May to June, mainly feeding on Corylus and Trifolium species.

They are found in central and northern Europe including British Isles, France, Italy, the east Palearctic realm and the Near East.
