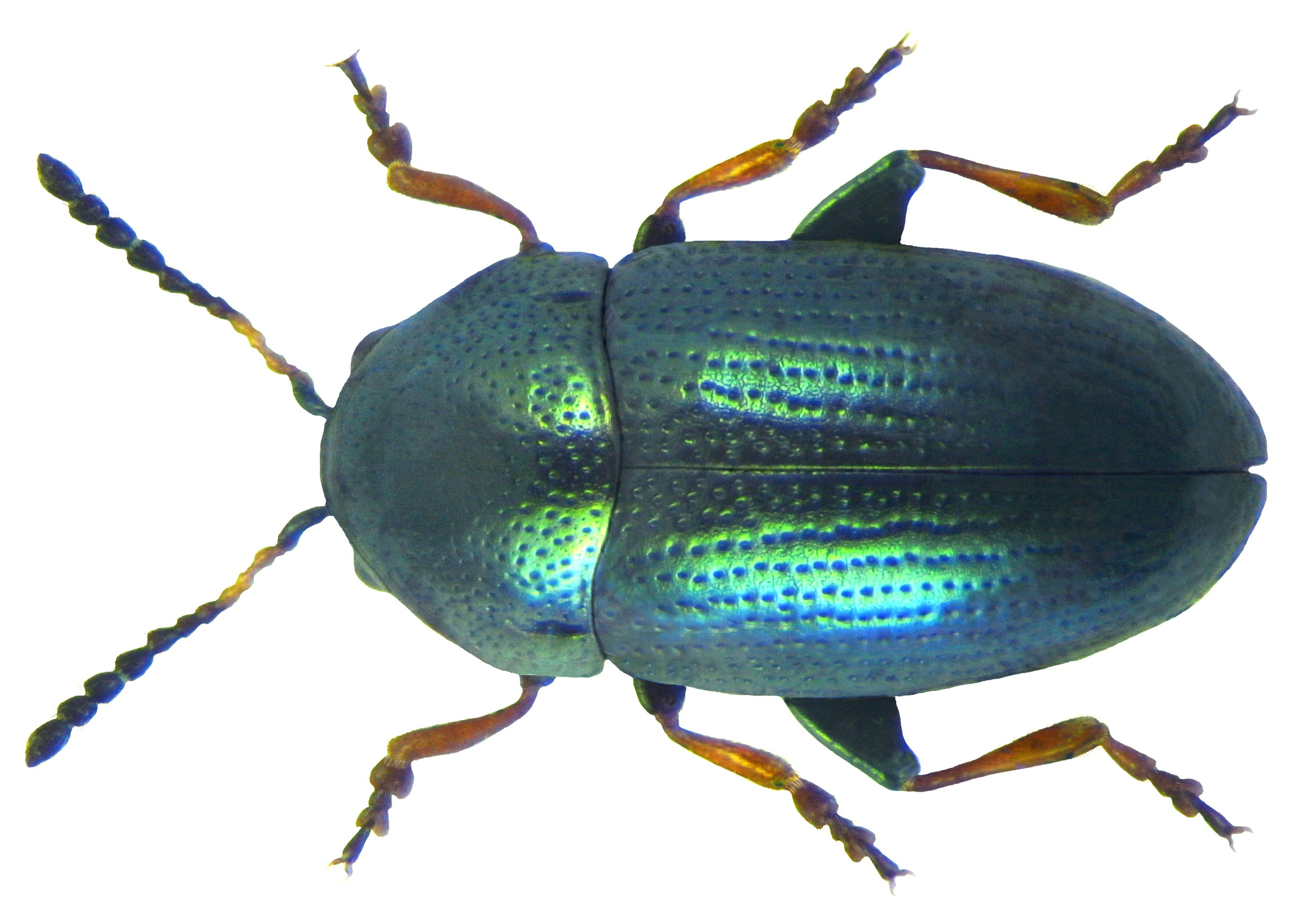

Scientific classification
- Kingdom: Animalia
- Phylum: Arthropoda
- Class: Insecta
- Order: Coleoptera
- Suborder: Polyphaga
- Infraorder: Cucujiformia
- Family: Chrysomelidae
- Genus: Mantura
- Species: M. matthewsii

Binomial name
- Mantura matthewsii (Curtis, 1833)

= Mantura matthewsii =

Species of beetle

Mantura matthewsii is a species of Chrysomelidae family, that is common in Slovakia, Turkey.
