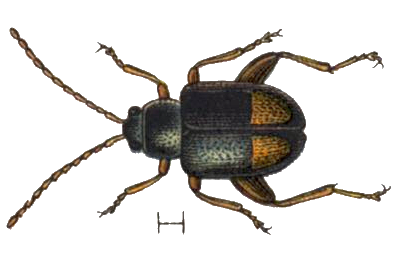

Scientific classification
- Kingdom: Animalia
- Phylum: Arthropoda
- Clade: Pancrustacea
- Class: Insecta
- Order: Coleoptera
- Suborder: Polyphaga
- Infraorder: Cucujiformia
- Family: Chrysomelidae
- Genus: Longitarsus
- Species: L. holsaticus

Binomial name
- Longitarsus holsaticus (Linnaeus, 1758)

Synonyms
- Chrysomela holsaticus Linnaeus, 1758

= Longitarsus holsaticus =

Species of beetle

Longitarsus holsaticus is a species of black coloured beetle in the subfamily Galerucinae that is native to Europe.
