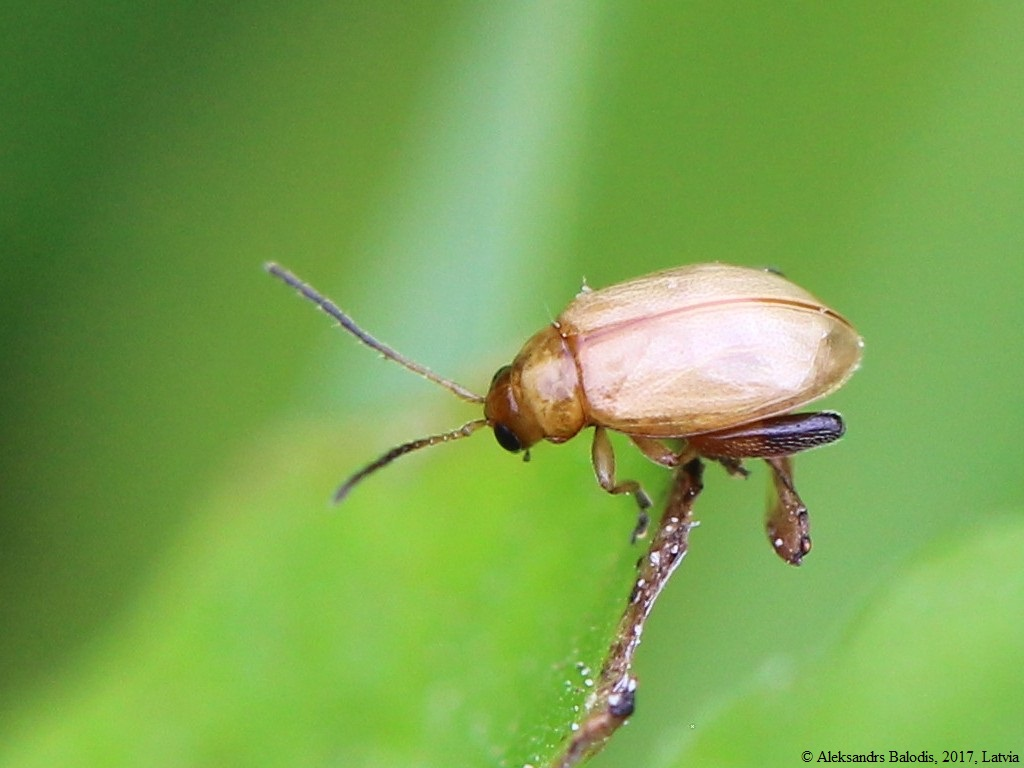

Scientific classification
- Domain: Eukaryota
- Kingdom: Animalia
- Phylum: Arthropoda
- Class: Insecta
- Order: Coleoptera
- Suborder: Polyphaga
- Infraorder: Cucujiformia
- Family: Chrysomelidae
- Genus: Longitarsus
- Species: L. ochroleucus

Binomial name
- Longitarsus ochroleucus (Marsham, 1802)

Synonyms
- Chrysomela ochroleuca Marsham, 1802; Altica albella (Dumeril, 1816); Longitarsus cognatus (Wollaston, 1860); Longitarsus ochroleucus ab. subnigra (Roubal, 1943); Longitarsus ochroleucus ssp. lindbergi (Madar, 1963)

= Longitarsus ochroleucus =

Species of beetle

Longitarsus ochroleucus is a species of beetle from Chrysomelidae family.

== Description ==
The species is yellowish-white coloured, and has orange legs and antennae.

== Distribution ==
The species can be found in Europe, including Northern England and South Sweden. It can also be found in Asia, including Asia Minor, the Caucasus, the Middle East, China and Nepal. The species is also common on the Canary Islands and in North Africa.
