= Longitarsus ganglbaueri =

Scientific classification
- Kingdom: Animalia
- Phylum: Arthropoda
- Clade: Pancrustacea
- Class: Insecta
- Order: Coleoptera
- Suborder: Polyphaga
- Infraorder: Cucujiformia
- Family: Chrysomelidae
- Genus: Longitarsus
- Species: L. ganglbaueri

Binomial name
- Longitarsus ganglbaueri Heikertinger, 1912

Synonyms
- Longitarsus senecionis Brisout, 1873 (homonym); Longitarsus ganglbaueri Heikertinger, 1912; Longitarsus ganglbaueri ssp. balachovskyi Hoffmann

Species of beetle

Longitarsus ganglbaueri is a species of beetle in the subfamily Galerucinae that can be found in Central Europe, Central Italy, Southern England, South Sweden, Mongolia, and Algeria. It can also be found in Dagestan, a Russian province.
