= Antoine Casimir Marguerite Eugène Foudras =

French entomologist

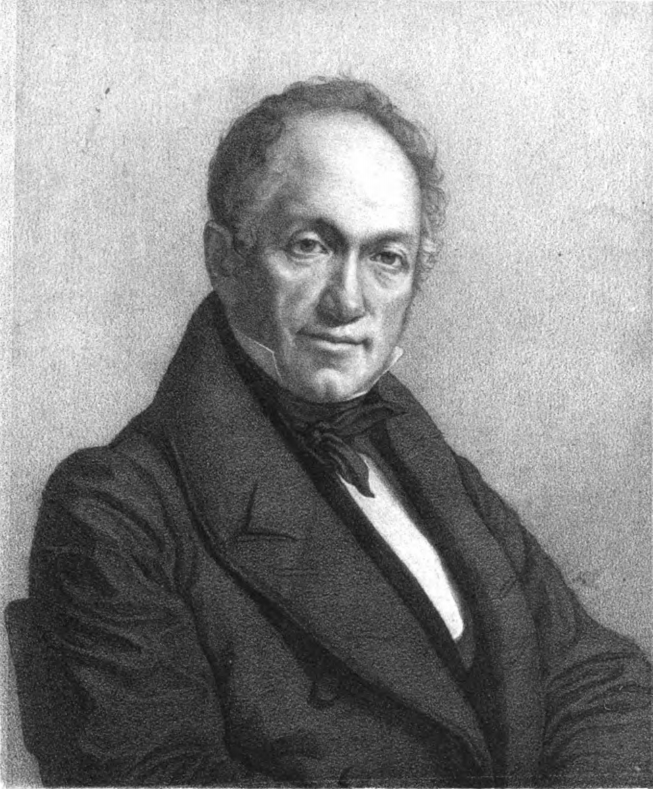
Antoine Casimir Marguerite Eugène Foudras

Antoine Casimir Marguerite Eugène Foudras (19 November 1783, in Lyon – 13 April 1859, in Lyon) was a French entomologist. He was a Member of the Société linnéenne de Lyon.

Although Eugène Foudras had to work hard to earn his living, he spent all his spare time collecting insects in various parts of France, especially Chamonix, Bresse, Dauphiné, Lyonnais and Mâconnais. Having sold his insect cabinet in 1837, he was able to devote himself entirely to entomology. He specialized in Flea beetles (many species in this group are major agricultural pests). The majority of Foudras' works remain in manuscript. His later collections were bequeathed to the Lycée du Parc in Lyon.

== Publications ==
- 1827 – Rapport à la Société royale d'agriculture... de Lyon, sur un concours ouvert pour la destruction de la pyrale de la vigne
- 1829 – Observations sur le tridactyle panaché
- 1860 – Altisides. Annales de la Société Linnéenne de Lyon (n.s.) 6: 137–384.
