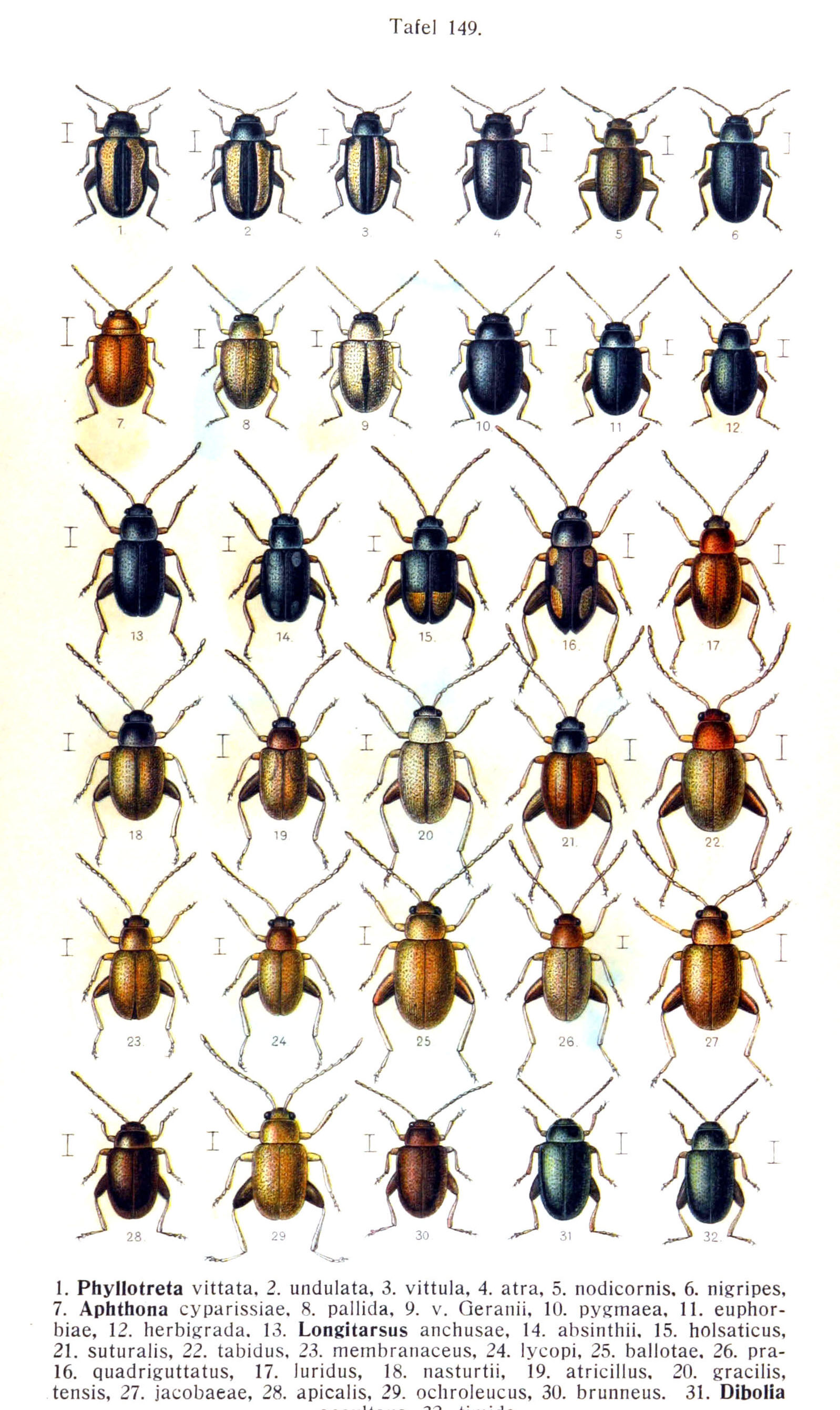
- Longitarsus in Reitter Fauna Germanica. Die Käfer des Deutschen Reiches

Scientific classification
- Kingdom: Animalia
- Phylum: Arthropoda
- Clade: Pancrustacea
- Class: Insecta
- Order: Coleoptera
- Suborder: Polyphaga
- Infraorder: Cucujiformia
- Family: Chrysomelidae
- Tribe: Alticini
- Genus: Longitarsus; Latreille, 1829

= Longitarsus =

Genus of beetles

Longitarsus is a genus of beetles in the family Chrysomelidae. It is the most speciose genus of flea beetles, comprising over 700 species, and has a cosmopolitan distribution.

== See also ==
- List of Longitarsus species
