= List of Chrysolina species =

This is a list of 130 species in Chrysolina, a genus of leaf beetles in the family Chrysomelidae.

== Chrysolina species ==
- Chrysolina affinis (Fabricius, 1787)^{g}
- Chrysolina americana (Linnaeus, 1758)^{g}
- Chrysolina analis (Linnaeus, 1767)^{g}
- Chrysolina atrovirens (Frivaldszky, 1876)^{g}
- Chrysolina aurichalcea (Mannerheim, 1825)^{g}
- Chrysolina auripennis (Say, 1824)^{i c g b}
- Chrysolina baetica (Suffrian, 1851)^{g}
- Chrysolina bankii (Fabricius, 1775)^{g b}
- Chrysolina banksi (Fabricius, 1775)^{g}
- Chrysolina basilaris (Say, 1824)^{i c g b}
- Chrysolina brunsvicensis (Gravenhorst, 1807)^{g}
- Chrysolina carnifex (Fabricius, 1792)^{g}
- Chrysolina carpathica (Fuss, 1856)^{g}
- Chrysolina caurina Brown, 1962^{i c g}
- Chrysolina cavigera (Sahlberg, 1885)^{i c g}
- Chrysolina cerealis (Linnaeus, 1767)^{g}
- Chrysolina chalcites (Germar, 1824)^{g}
- Chrysolina cinctipennis (Harold, 1874)^{g}
- Chrysolina coerulans (Scriba, 1791)^{g}
- Chrysolina colasi (Cobos, 1952)^{g}
- Chrysolina corcyria (Suffrian, 1851)^{g}
- Chrysolina costalis (Olivier, 1807)^{g}
- Chrysolina cretica (Olivier, 1807)^{g}
- Chrysolina cribaria (Rogers, 1856)^{i c g}
- Chrysolina cribrosa (Ahrens, 1812)^{g}
- Chrysolina cuiae Ge & Daccordi^{g}
- Chrysolina cuprina (Duftschmid, 1825)^{g}
- Chrysolina curvilinea (Weise, 1884)^{g}
- Chrysolina deubeli (Ganglbauer, 1897)^{g}
- Chrysolina didymata (Scriba, 1791)^{g}
- Chrysolina diluta (Germar, 1824)^{g}
- Chrysolina eurina (Frivaldszky, 1883)^{g}
- Chrysolina extorris Brown, 1962^{i c g}
- Chrysolina fastuosa (Scopoli, 1763)^{g}
- Chrysolina femoralis (Olivier, 1790)^{g}
- Chrysolina fimbrialis (Kuster, 1845)^{g}
- Chrysolina flavomarginata (Say, 1824)^{i c g b}
- Chrysolina fortunata (Wollaston, 1864)^{g}
- Chrysolina fragariae (Wollaston, 1854)^{g}
- Chrysolina geminata (Paykull, 1799)^{g}
- Chrysolina globipennis (Suffrian, 1851)^{g}
- Chrysolina globosa (Panzer, 1805)^{g}
- Chrysolina graminis (Linnaeus, 1758)^{g}
- Chrysolina grancanariensis (Lindberg, 1953)^{g}
- Chrysolina grossa (Fabricius, 1792)^{g}
- Chrysolina gyacaensis Daccordi & Yang^{g}
- Chrysolina gypsophilae (Küster, 1845)^{g}
- Chrysolina haemoptera (Stephens)^{g}
- Chrysolina halysa Bechyne, 1950^{g}
- Chrysolina helopioides (Suffrian, 1851)^{g}
- Chrysolina herbacea (Duftschmid, 1825)^{g}
- Chrysolina hohxilensis Daccordi & Ge^{g}
- Chrysolina hongyuanensis Daccordi & Ge^{g}
- Chrysolina hudsonica Brown, 1938^{i c g}
- Chrysolina hyperici (Forster, 1771)^{i c g b} (St. Johns wort leaf beetle)
- Chrysolina hyrcana (Weise, 1884)^{g}
- Chrysolina inflata (Weise, 1916)^{g}
- Chrysolina inornata (Rogers, 1856)^{i c g}
- Chrysolina interstincta (Suffrian, 1851)^{g}
- Chrysolina jenisseiensis (Breit, 1920)^{g}
- Chrysolina kuesteri (Helliesen, 1911)^{g}
- Chrysolina laeviguttata Chujo, 1958^{g}
- Chrysolina latecincta (Demaison, 1896)^{g}
- Chrysolina lepida (Olivier, 1807)^{g}
- Chrysolina lichenis (Richter, 1820)^{g}
- Chrysolina limbata (Fabricius, 1775)^{g}
- Chrysolina lucida (Olivier, 1807)^{g}
- Chrysolina lucidicollis (Küster, 1845)^{g}
- Chrysolina lutea (Petagna, 1819)^{g}
- Chrysolina mactata (Fairmaire, 1859)^{g}
- Chrysolina magniceps (J.R.Sahlberg, 1885)^{g}
- Chrysolina marcasitica (Germar, 1824)^{g}
- Chrysolina marginata (Linnaeus, 1758)^{i c g b}
- Chrysolina markamensis Daccordi & Ge^{g}
- Chrysolina milleri (Weise, 1884)^{g}
- Chrysolina obenbergeri Bechyne, 1950^{g}
- Chrysolina obscurella (Suffrian, 1851)^{g}
- Chrysolina obsoleta (Brulle, 1838)^{g}
- Chrysolina oceanoripensis Bourdonné, Doguet & Petitpierre, 2013^{g}
- Chrysolina ohoi Chujo, 1958^{g}
- Chrysolina olivieri (Bedel, 1892)^{g}
- Chrysolina oricalcia (Müller, 1776)^{g}
- Chrysolina orientalis (Olivier, 1807)^{g}
- Chrysolina osellai (Daccordi & Ruffo, 1979)^{g}
- Chrysolina peregrina (Herrich-Schäffer, 1838)^{g}
- Chrysolina petitpierrei Kippenberg, 2004^{g}
- Chrysolina philotesia Daccordi & Ruffo, 1980^{g}
- Chrysolina platypoda (Bechyné, 1950)^{g}
- Chrysolina platyscelidina (Jacobson, 1898)^{g}
- Chrysolina pliginskii (Reitter, 1913)^{g}
- Chrysolina polita (Linnaeus, 1758)^{g}
- Chrysolina pourtoyi Bourdonné, 1997^{g}
- Chrysolina pseudolurida (Roubal, 1917)^{g}
- Chrysolina purpurascens (Germar, 1822)^{g}
- Chrysolina quadrigemina (Suffrian, 1851)^{i c g b} (klamath weed beetle)
- Chrysolina reitteri (Weise, 1884)^{g}
- Chrysolina relucens (Rosenhauer, 1847)^{g}
- Chrysolina rhodia Bechyne, 1950^{g}
- Chrysolina rossia (Illiger, 1802)^{g}
- Chrysolina rufa (Duftschmid, 1825)^{g}
- Chrysolina rufoaenea (Suffrian, 1851)^{g}
- Chrysolina sahlbergi (Menetries, 1832)^{g}
- Chrysolina salviae (Germar, 1824)^{g}
- Chrysolina sanguinolenta (Linnaeus, 1758)^{g}
- Chrysolina schaefferi Brown, 1962^{i c g b}
- Chrysolina schatzmayri (Muller, 1916)^{g}
- Chrysolina schneideri (Weise, 1882)^{g}
- Chrysolina septentrionalis (Ménétriés, 1851)^{g b}
- Chrysolina shuyongi Ge & Daccordi^{g}
- Chrysolina stachydis (Gené, 1839)^{g}
- Chrysolina staphylaea (Linnaeus, 1758)^{i c g b} (brown mint leaf beetle)
- Chrysolina sturmi (Westhoff, 1882)^{g}
- Chrysolina substrangulata Bourdonne, 1986^{g}
- Chrysolina subsulcata (Mannerheim, 1853)^{i c g b}
- Chrysolina suffriani (Fairmaire, 1859)^{g}
- Chrysolina susterai Bechyne, 1950^{g}
- Chrysolina tagana (Suffrian, 1851)^{g}
- Chrysolina taygetana Bechyne, 1952^{g}
- Chrysolina timarchoides (Brisout de Barneville, 1883)^{g}
- Chrysolina turca (Fairmaire, 1865)^{g}
- Chrysolina umbratilis (Weise, 1887)^{g}
- Chrysolina varians (Schaller, 1783)^{i c g b} (St. John's wort beetle)
- Chrysolina variolosa (Petagna, 1819)^{g}
- Chrysolina vernalis (Brullé, 1832)^{g}
- Chrysolina viridana (Küster, 1844)^{g}
- Chrysolina weisei (Frivaldszky, 1883)^{g}
- Chrysolina wollastoni Bechyne, 1957^{g}
- Chrysolina wollosowiczi (Jacobson, 1910)^{i c g}
- Chrysolina zhangi Ge & Daccordi^{g}

Data sources: i = ITIS, c = Catalogue of Life, g = GBIF, b = Bugguide.net
