= Chrysolina subsulcata =

Scientific classification
- Kingdom: Animalia
- Phylum: Arthropoda
- Clade: Pancrustacea
- Class: Insecta
- Order: Coleoptera
- Suborder: Polyphaga
- Infraorder: Cucujiformia
- Family: Chrysomelidae
- Genus: Chrysolina
- Subgenus: Arctolina
- Species: C. subsulcata

Binomial name
- Chrysolina subsulcata (Mannerheim, 1853)

Species of beetle

Chrysolina subsulcata is a species of leaf beetle in the family Chrysomelidae. It is found in Europe and Northern Asia (excluding China) and North America.
