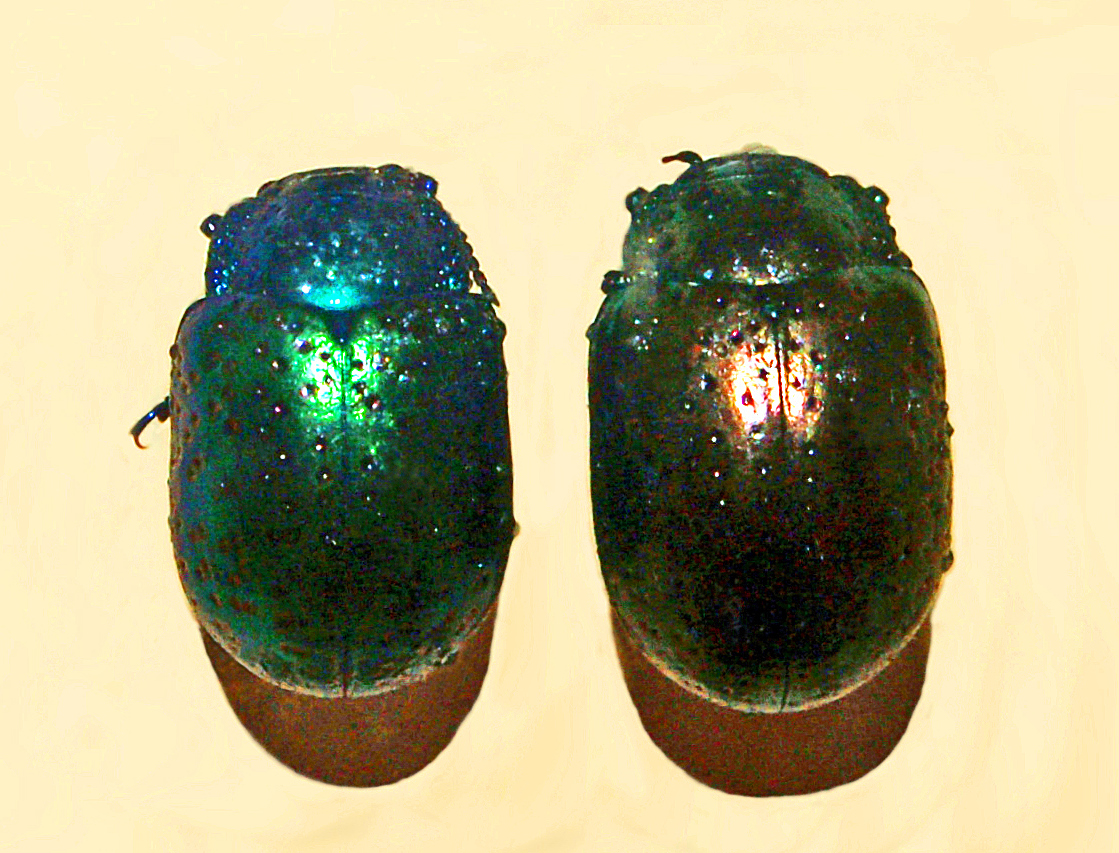
- Chrysolina bicolor

Scientific classification
- Kingdom: Animalia
- Phylum: Arthropoda
- Clade: Pancrustacea
- Class: Insecta
- Order: Coleoptera
- Suborder: Polyphaga
- Infraorder: Cucujiformia
- Family: Chrysomelidae
- Genus: Chrysolina
- Subgenus: Centoptera
- Species: C. bicolor

Binomial name
- Chrysolina bicolor (Fabricius, 1775)

= Chrysolina bicolor =

Species of beetle

Chrysolina bicolor is a species of beetle belonging to the Chrysomelidae family.

== Description ==
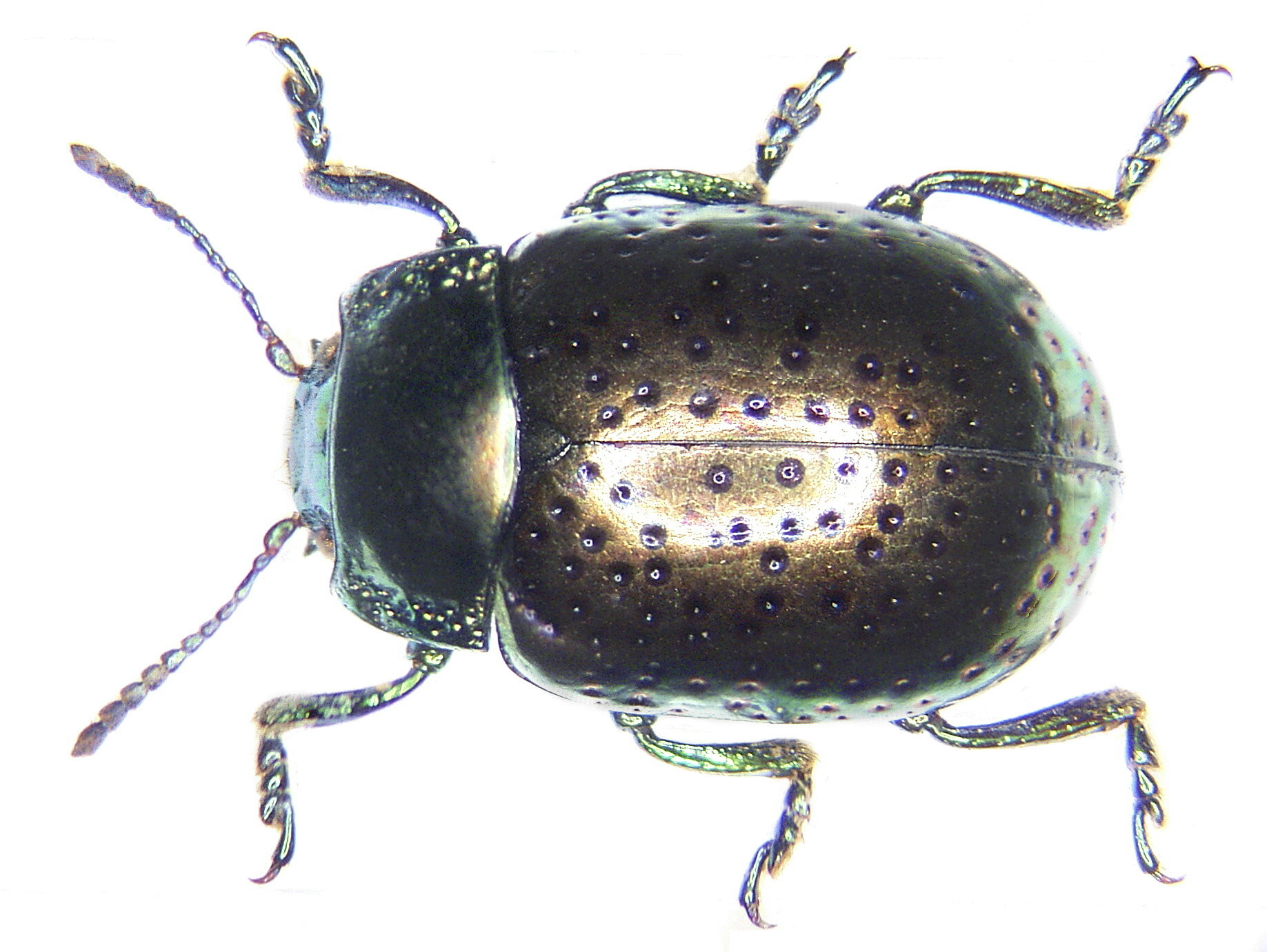
Chrysolina bicolor

Chrysolina bicolor reaches about 11 millimetres (0.43 in) in length, with females slightly larger than males. Pronotum is usually metallic blue. Elytra are densely punctured and vary from metallic green to reddish, sometimes with darker violet spots. The main host plants are lavender, oregano, rosemary and thyme.

== Distribution ==
This species occurs in Spain, Portugal, Sicily, Croatia and North Africa.
