= Chrysolina fuliginosa =

Scientific classification
- Kingdom: Animalia
- Phylum: Arthropoda
- Clade: Pancrustacea
- Class: Insecta
- Order: Coleoptera
- Suborder: Polyphaga
- Infraorder: Cucujiformia
- Family: Chrysomelidae
- Genus: Chrysolina
- Subgenus: Allochrysolina
- Species: C. fuliginosa

Binomial name
- Chrysolina fuliginosa (Olivier, 1807)

Synonyms
- Chrysomela fuliginosa (Olivier, 1807); Chrysomela opaca (Suffrian, 1853)

Species of beetle

Chrysolina fuliginosa is a species of beetle from a family of Chrysomelidae, that can be found in France, Northern Italy, Northern Spain, and West Germany.

== Description ==
Both sexes of the species are gray, though females are larger than males.
