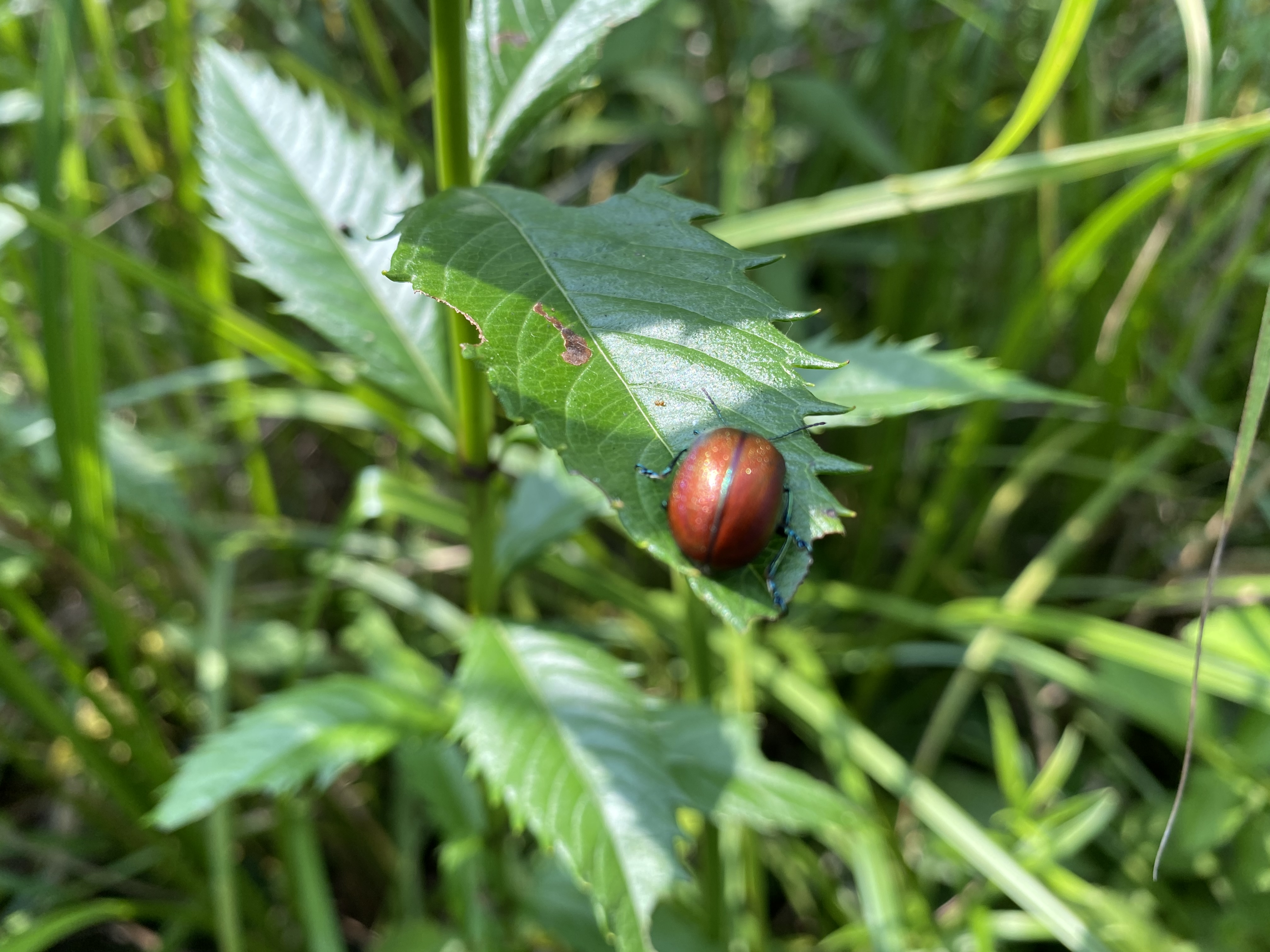

Scientific classification
- Kingdom: Animalia
- Phylum: Arthropoda
- Clade: Pancrustacea
- Class: Insecta
- Order: Coleoptera
- Suborder: Polyphaga
- Infraorder: Cucujiformia
- Family: Chrysomelidae
- Genus: Chrysolina
- Subgenus: Euchrysolina
- Species: C. virgata

Binomial name
- Chrysolina virgata (Motschulsky, 1860)

Synonyms
- Chrysolina eximia (Baly, 1862); Chrysolina obscurofasciata (Jacoby, 1885); Chrysomela eximia Baly, 1862; Chrysomela obscurofasciata Jacoby, 1885; Chrysomela virgata Motschulsky

= Chrysolina virgata =

Species of beetle

Chrysolina virgata is a species of leaf beetle in the genus Chrysolina.

== Taxonomy ==
The genus Chrysolina currently contains 39 subgenera. C. virgata is located in the subgenus Euchrysolina which additionally contains only C. graminis and its five associated subspecies; this subgenus was first established in 1950 by Bechyné.

== Description ==
C. virgata is a small, round leaf beetle. Dorsally it is metallic green in colour, iridescent bronze on its elytra and pronotum. It is also finely punctured across both areas.

== Distribution and habitat ==
C. virgata is a Palaearctic species native to East Asia and Japan.
