= Chrysolina schaefferi =

Scientific classification
- Kingdom: Animalia
- Phylum: Arthropoda
- Clade: Pancrustacea
- Class: Insecta
- Order: Coleoptera
- Suborder: Polyphaga
- Infraorder: Cucujiformia
- Family: Chrysomelidae
- Genus: Chrysolina
- Subgenus: Allohypericia
- Species: C. schaefferi

Binomial name
- Chrysolina schaefferi Brown, 1962

Species of beetle

Chrysolina schaefferi is a species of leaf beetle in the family Chrysomelidae. It is found in North America.
