= Allochrysolina =

Scientific classification
- Kingdom: Animalia
- Phylum: Arthropoda
- Clade: Pancrustacea
- Class: Insecta
- Order: Coleoptera
- Suborder: Polyphaga
- Infraorder: Cucujiformia
- Family: Chrysomelidae
- Genus: Chrysolina
- Subgenus: Allochrysolina; Bechyné, 1950

Species
- Chrysolina fuliginosa (Olivier, 1807); Chrysolina lepida (Olivier 1807)

Subgenus of beetles

Allochrysolina is a subgenus of the genus Chrysolina of the subfamily Chrysomelinae within the family of leaf beetles. Species of this subgenus are found in Europe and North Africa.
