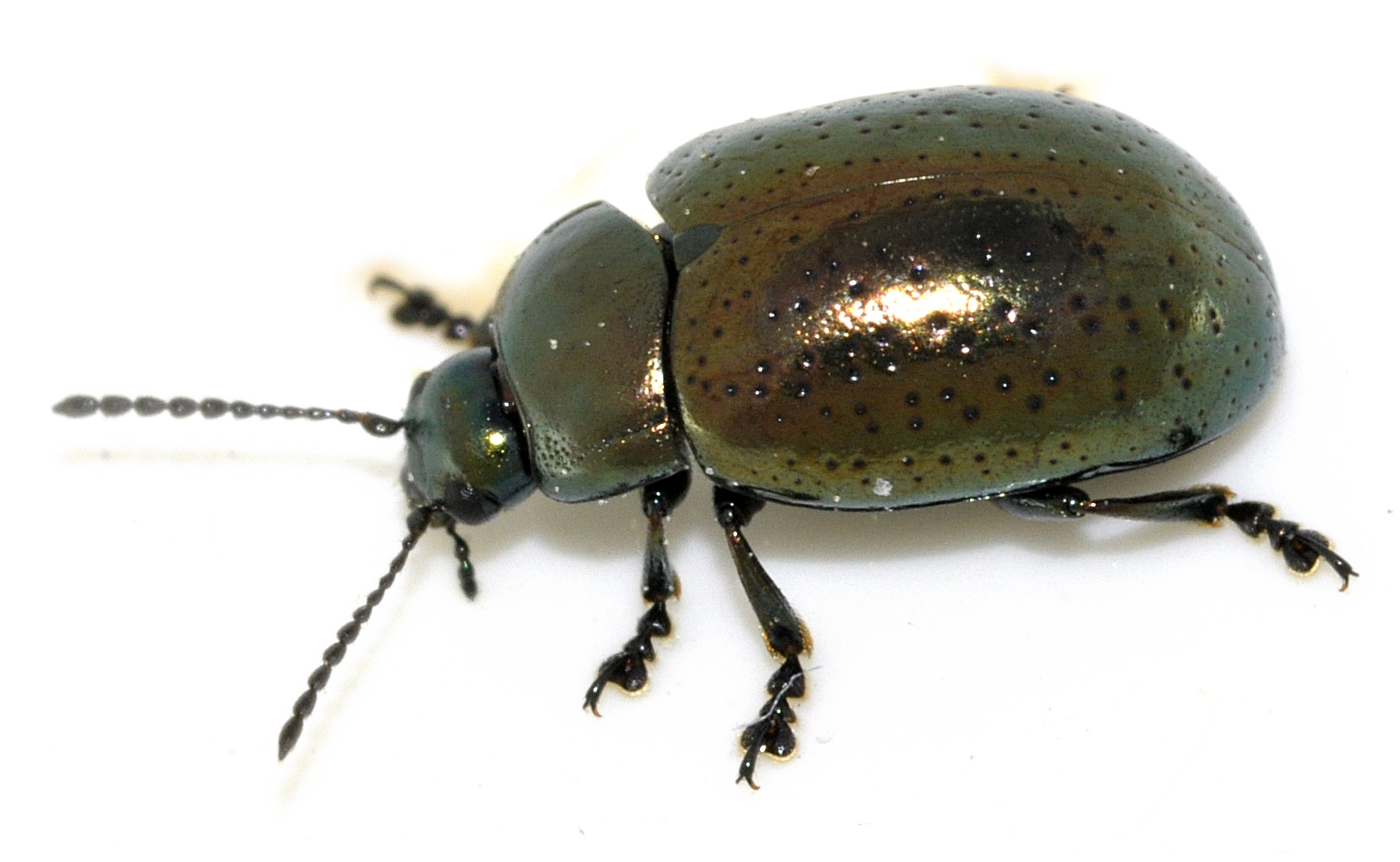

Scientific classification
- Kingdom: Animalia
- Phylum: Arthropoda
- Clade: Pancrustacea
- Class: Insecta
- Order: Coleoptera
- Suborder: Polyphaga
- Infraorder: Cucujiformia
- Family: Chrysomelidae
- Genus: Chrysolina
- Subgenus: Hypericia
- Species: C. hyperici

Binomial name
- Chrysolina hyperici (Forster, 1771)

Synonyms
- Chrysolina (Hypericia) hyperici hyperici (Forster, 1771); Chrysomela hyperici Forster, 1771

= Chrysolina hyperici =

Species of beetle

Chrysolina hyperici, the lesser Saint John's wort beetle is a species of beetles of the family Chrysomelidae.

== Life cycle ==
Feeding on Hypericum perforatum, in British Columbia, Canada

The species lays up to 2,000 eggs on the host plant during the early fall. They lay their eggs on the undersides of leaves of new fall basal growth on its host plant, St. John's Wort (Hypericum perforatum), although it is also known to feed on other species of Hypericum. The larvae feed for a month on the leaves, emerging at night and hiding during the day. When full grown they move to the soil to pupate. After two weeks they emerge as adults. In the spring the adults feed upon new growth of their host plant.

== Taxonomy ==
In France

The species is most often classified as Chrysolina hyperici (Forster, 1771), however it was originally placed in the genus Chrysomela as Chrysomela hyperici. It was first scientifically described and named by Johann Reinhold Forster in Novæ species insectorum in the year 1771. Within the genus Chrysolina, the species is classified in the subgenus Hypericia. It is closely related to the species Chrysolina quadrigemina.

=== Etymology ===
Chrysolina hyperici is often known in English by the common names "St. Johnswort Beetle", "Saint John's Wort Beetle" or close variations. In the United States C. hyperici is also known by the common name "klamathweed beetle" from one of the common names of Hypericum perforatum. It is also known as the lesser St. John's wort beetle, distinguishing it from the greater St. John's wort beetle (Chrysolina quadrigemina).

== Distribution ==
Originally distributed in Europa and Asia, it has been introduced in other places as biological control of Hypericum perforatum.
