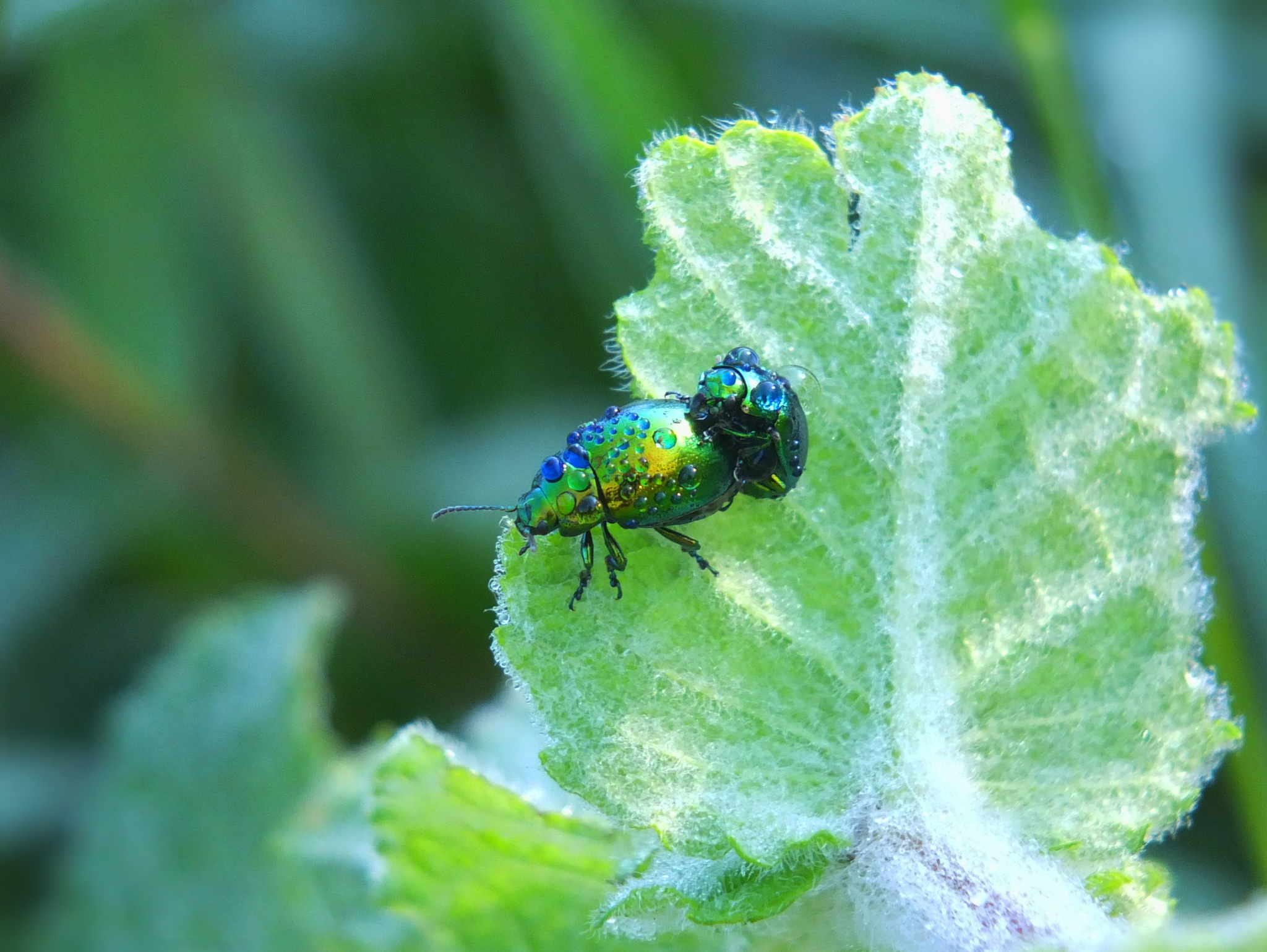

Scientific classification
- Kingdom: Animalia
- Phylum: Arthropoda
- Clade: Pancrustacea
- Class: Insecta
- Order: Coleoptera
- Suborder: Polyphaga
- Infraorder: Cucujiformia
- Family: Chrysomelidae
- Genus: Chrysolina
- Subgenus: Synerga
- Species: C. viridana

Binomial name
- Chrysolina viridana (Küster, 1844)

= Chrysolina viridana =

Species of beetle

Chrysolina viridana is a species of beetle in the family Chrysomelidae.

== Distribution ==
The species lives in the Mediterranean region, in areas like Corsica, Sardinia, Sicily, Southern Italy, Spain, Portugal and North Africa.
