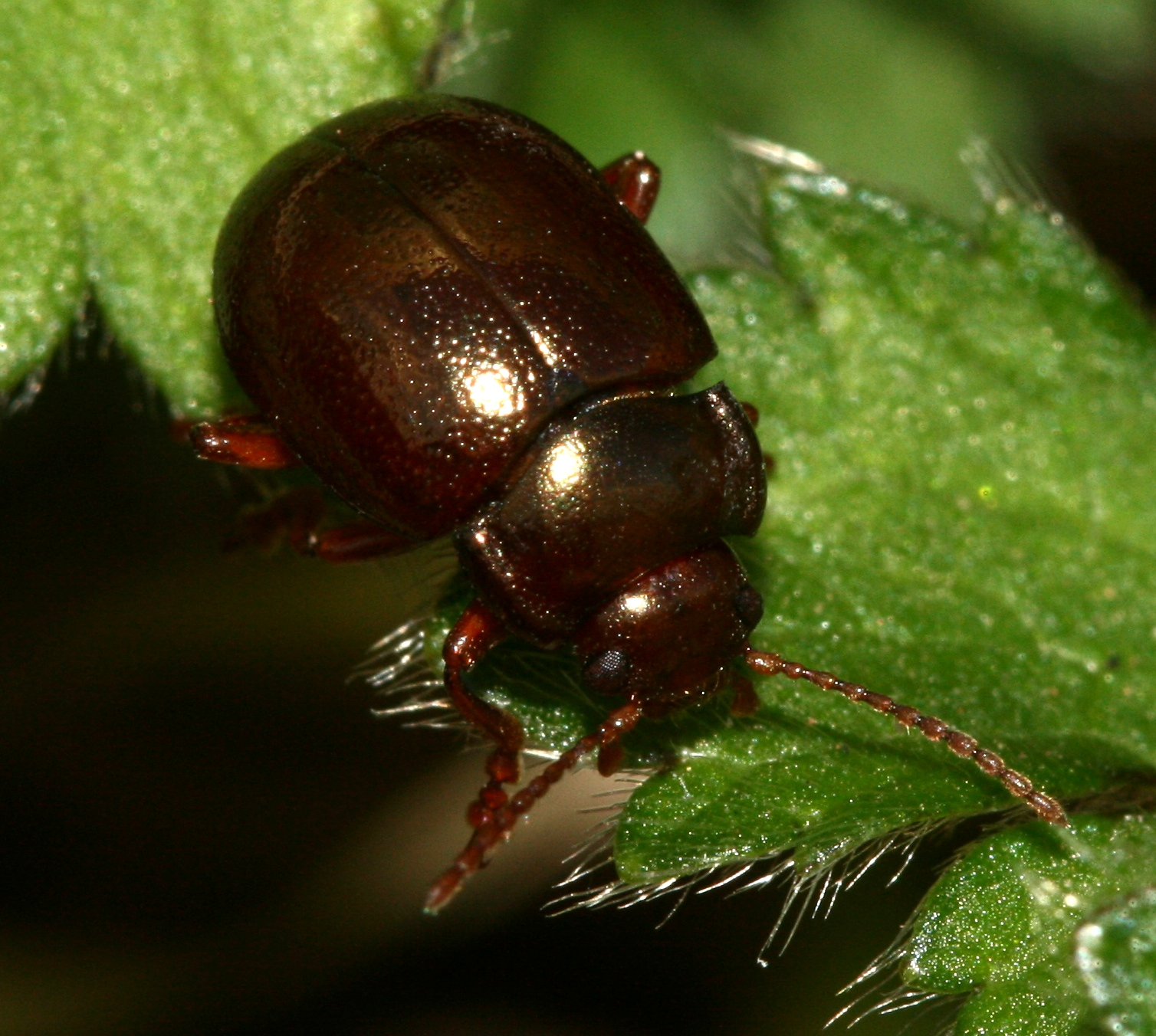

Scientific classification
- Kingdom: Animalia
- Phylum: Arthropoda
- Clade: Pancrustacea
- Class: Insecta
- Order: Coleoptera
- Suborder: Polyphaga
- Infraorder: Cucujiformia
- Family: Chrysomelidae
- Genus: Chrysolina
- Subgenus: Chrysolina
- Species: C. staphylaea

Binomial name
- Chrysolina staphylaea (Linnaeus, 1758)

= Chrysolina staphylaea =

Species of beetle

Chrysolina staphylaea is a species of leaf beetle native to Europe. It has also been found in Eastern Canada, with the first discovery being in Halifax, Nova Scotia in June 1897. The beetle has a reddish-brown body.
