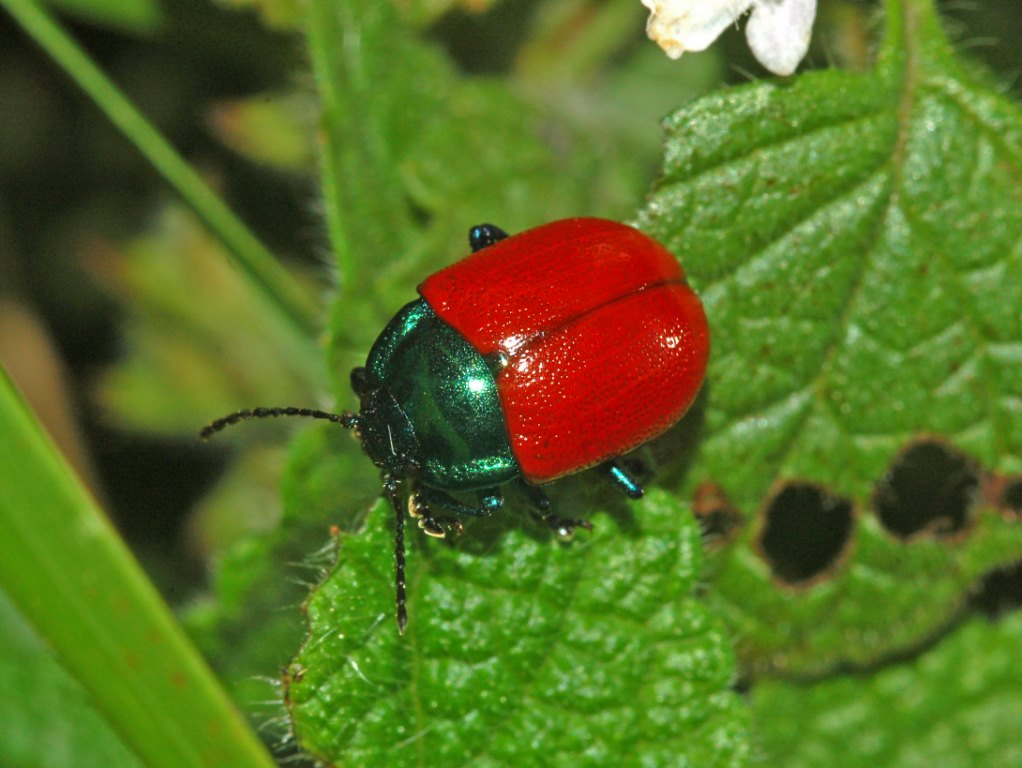

Scientific classification
- Kingdom: Animalia
- Phylum: Arthropoda
- Clade: Pancrustacea
- Class: Insecta
- Order: Coleoptera
- Suborder: Polyphaga
- Infraorder: Cucujiformia
- Family: Chrysomelidae
- Genus: Chrysolina
- Subgenus: Melasomoptera
- Species: C. grossa

Binomial name
- Chrysolina grossa (Fabricius, 1792)

= Chrysolina grossa =

Species of beetle

Chrysolina grossa, the red leaf beetle, is a species of broad-shouldered leaf beetles belonging to the family Chrysomelidae, subfamily Chrysomelinae.

== Subspecies ==
Species within this genus include:

- Chrysolina grossa chloromaura (Olivier, 1807)
- Chrysolina grossa grossa (Fabricius, 1792)
- Chrysolina grossa tingitana (Escalera, 1914)

== Distribution ==
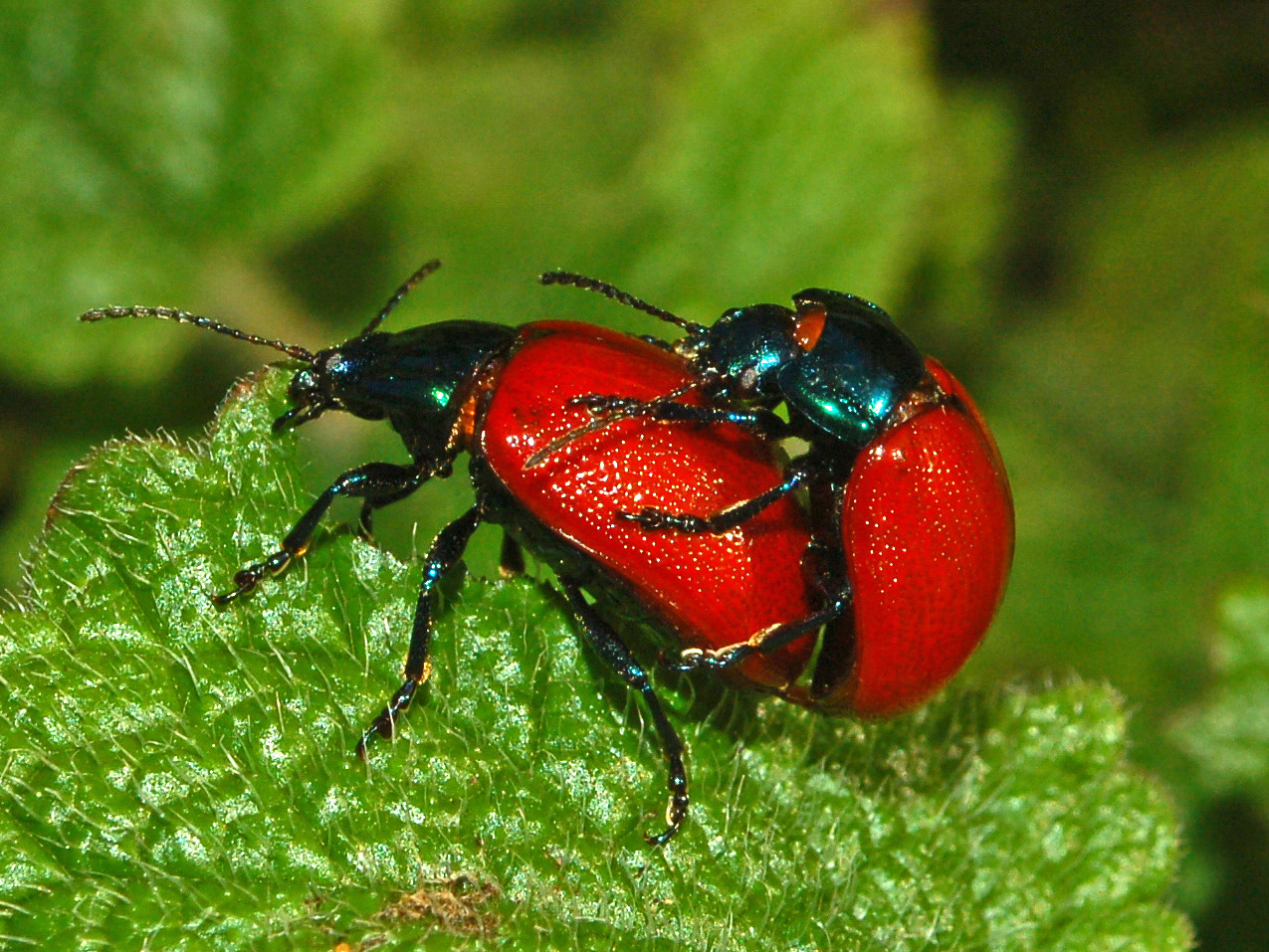
C. grossa – Mating pair

This species is mainly found in France, Italy, Spain and former Yugoslavia.

== Description ==
Chrysolina grossa can reach a length of about 10 millimetres (0.39 in). Head and pronotum show metallic blue-green colours, while elytra are bright red. It can be distinguished from Chrysomela populi for its longer antennae and wider pronotum.

== Biology ==
It feeds on wild plants of the Lamiaceae species.
