= Chrysolina suffriani =

Scientific classification
- Kingdom: Animalia
- Phylum: Arthropoda
- Clade: Pancrustacea
- Class: Insecta
- Order: Coleoptera
- Suborder: Polyphaga
- Infraorder: Cucujiformia
- Family: Chrysomelidae
- Genus: Chrysolina
- Subgenus: Synerga
- Species: C. suffriani

Binomial name
- Chrysolina suffriani (Fairmaire, 1889)

Species of beetle

Chrysolina suffriani is a species of beetle from the Chrysomelidae family, inhabits in Sardinia, Corsica.

== Description ==
The species are of brown colour.
