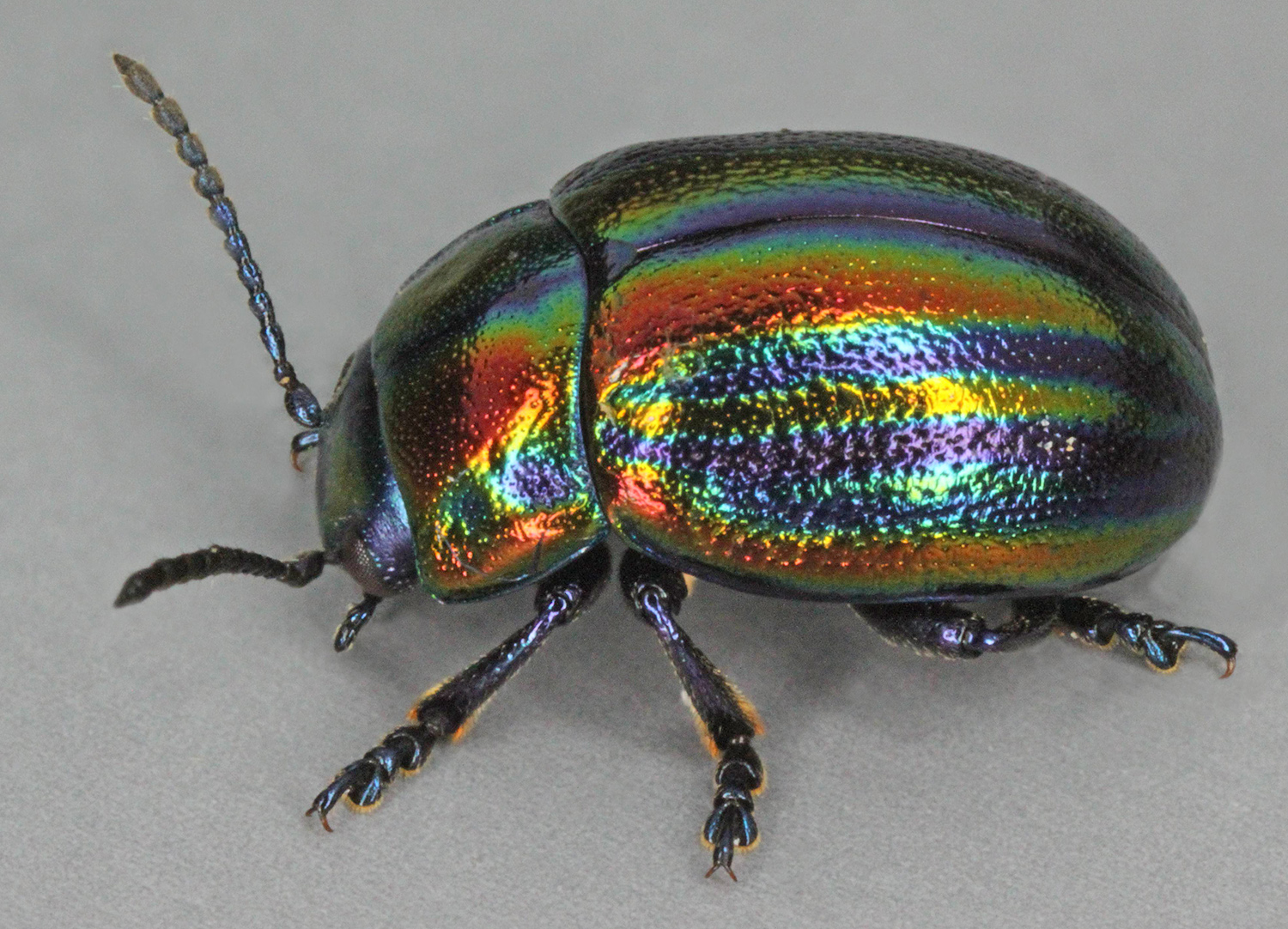

Scientific classification
- Kingdom: Animalia
- Phylum: Arthropoda
- Clade: Pancrustacea
- Class: Insecta
- Order: Coleoptera
- Suborder: Polyphaga
- Infraorder: Cucujiformia
- Family: Chrysomelidae
- Genus: Chrysolina
- Subgenus: Chrysomorpha; Motschulsky, 1860
- Species: C. cerealis

Binomial name
- Chrysolina cerealis (Linnaeus, 1767)

Synonyms
- Chrysolina carnifex melanaria (Suffrian, 1851); Chrysomela cerealis Linnaeus, 1767

= Chrysolina cerealis =

Species of beetle

Chrysolina cerealis, the rainbow leaf beetle or Snowdon beetle, is a beetle belonging to the family Chrysomelidae.

== Subspecies ==
Subspecies within this genus include:

- Chrysolina cerealis cerealis (Linnaeus, 1767) (Central and Western Europe)
- Chrysolina cerealis cyaneoaurata (Motschulsky, 1860) (Siberia, Mongolia)
- Chrysolina cerealis megerlei (Fabricius, 1801) (Central and South-Eastern Europe)
- Chrysolina cerealis mixta (Küster, 1844) (Alps, Pyrenees)
- Chrysolina cerealis rufolineata (Motschulsky, 1860) (Northern Caucasus, Crimea, Ukraine, European Russia)

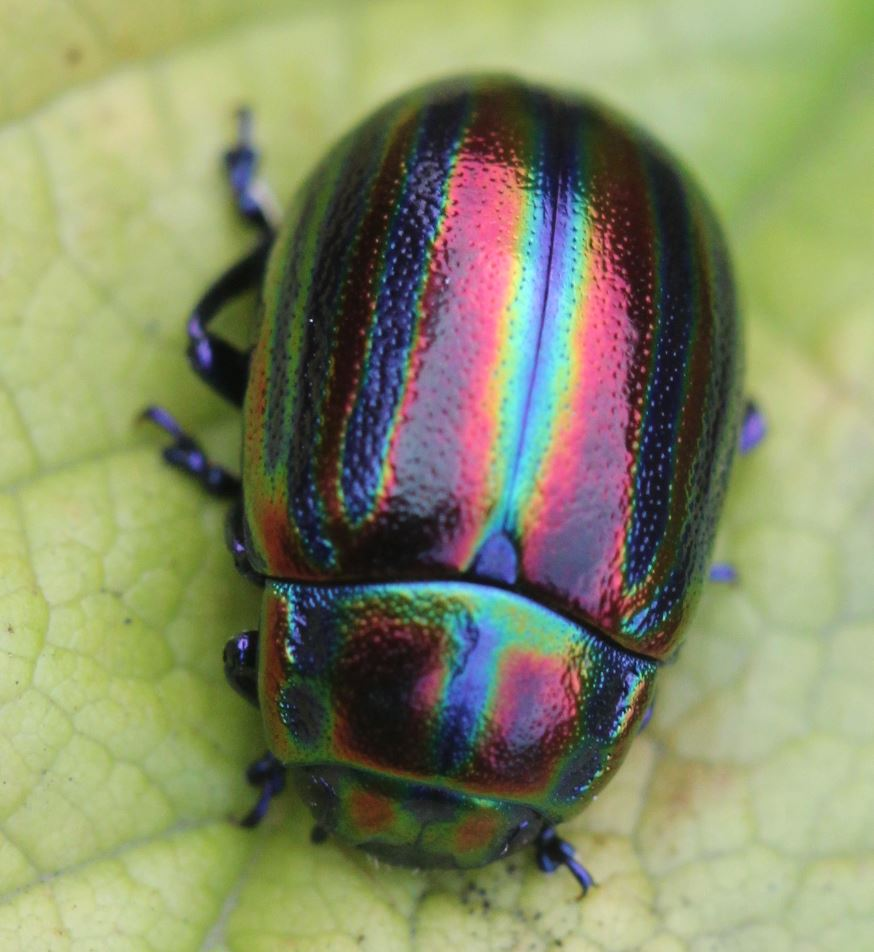

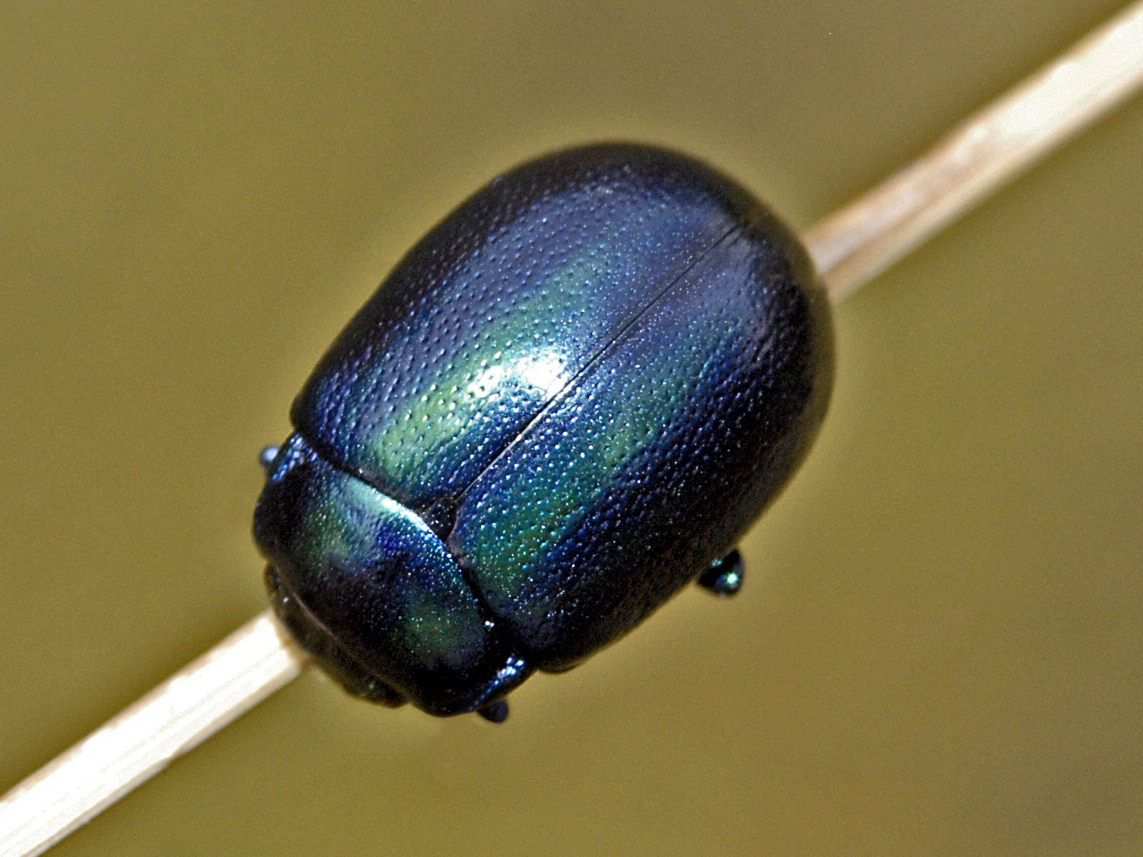
Chrysolina cerealis mixta

== Distribution and habitat ==
This species is present in most Eurasian countries, from Norway to northern Italy, and from Ussuri in the east to Snowdonia (Wales) in the west. These leaf beetles can be found in forests, woodlands, meadows, wastelands and montane grasslands over 600m above sea level.

== Description ==
Chrysolina cerealis can reach a length of 5.5–10 millimetres (0.22–0.39 in). Females are typically larger than males. Coloration of the pronotum and the elytra is quite variable, usually it is metallic green with three blue and red longitudinal stripes, with golden reflections (hence the common name). The subspecies Chrysolina cerealis mixta has metallic blue pronotum and elytra. The underparts are dark blue.

== Biology ==
Adults can be found from April to September. This beetle lives on base-rich screes and lays its eggs during June on grasses such as Agrostis capillaris and Festuca ovina, although both larvae and adults mostly feed on the wild thyme Thymus polytrichus, preferring the flowers to the leaves.

== In Wales ==
Within Wales, C. cerealis is found at only a few sites on the western flanks of Snowdon, and perhaps in Cwm Idwal in the neighbouring Glyderau. The population is thought to be genetically distinct, and the species is classified as endangered in the UK and protected under Schedule 5 of the Wildlife and Countryside Act, 1981. The species has not been found since 1980 in Cwm Idwal, and some reports consider the Snowdon population of about 1000 adults to be in "serious decline", while others say that there is no evidence of a decline, but that the species may always have been rare.
