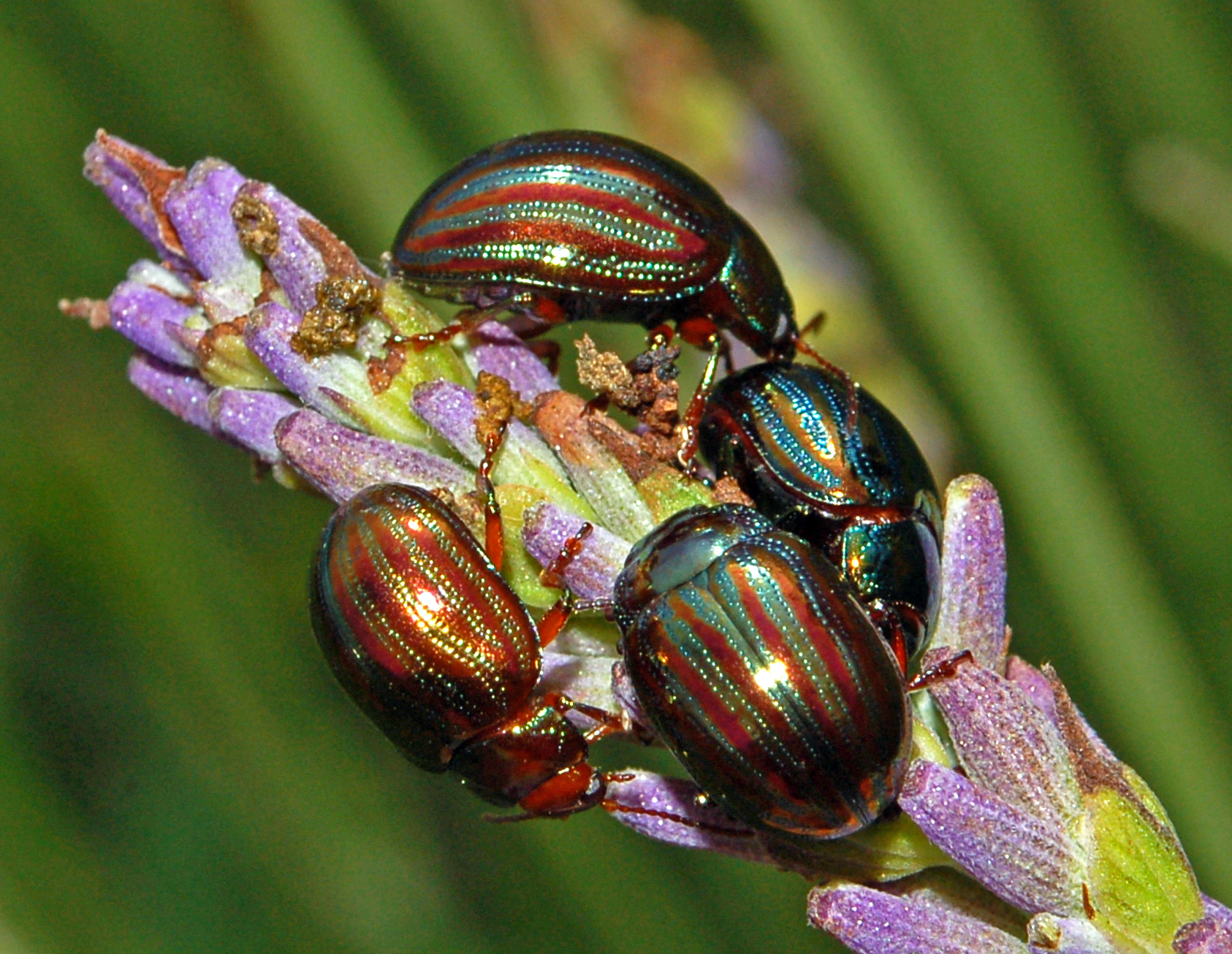
- Chrysolina americana on lavender (Lavandula sp.)

Scientific classification
- Kingdom: Animalia
- Phylum: Arthropoda
- Clade: Pancrustacea
- Class: Insecta
- Order: Coleoptera
- Suborder: Polyphaga
- Infraorder: Cucujiformia
- Family: Chrysomelidae
- Genus: Chrysolina
- Subgenus: Taeniochrysea
- Species: C. americana

Binomial name
- Chrysolina americana (Linnaeus, 1758)

= Chrysolina americana =

Species of beetle

Chrysolina americana, common name rosemary beetle, is a species of beetle belonging to the family Chrysomelidae.

== Description ==
Chrysolina americana can reach a length of 5–8 millimetres (0.20–0.31 in). They have colourful elytra with metallic green and purple longitudinal stripes. The wings are quite short, so these beetles can fly for short distances, but most tend to walk.

This species feeds on various aromatic Lamiaceae, mainly on rosemary (Salvia rosmarinus) (hence the common name), lavender (Lavandula) and thyme (Thymus).

In the Mediterranean region females lay their eggs in late summer on the leaves of the host plants. The larvae show whitish to blackish bands. Larval development continues during the winter months. The pupal stage lasts about three weeks. The imago is released in the spring.

== Distribution ==
Despite the species name americana, this leaf beetle is native and common to southern Europe, North Africa, the Near East and the Middle East.

== Introduction to the United Kingdom ==
This species was first discovered living outdoors in the United Kingdom in 1994. By 2002 it had become widespread in the London area, and spreading rapidly throughout. Although it is susceptible to some pesticides, it is usually recommended that home growers pick off beetles by hand, or shake them off onto a sheet of paper to remove them, if the plant affected by them is intended for culinary purposes. Otherwise, they do not present a major problem to the host plants, although a large, long- term infestation can be devastating.

== Gallery ==
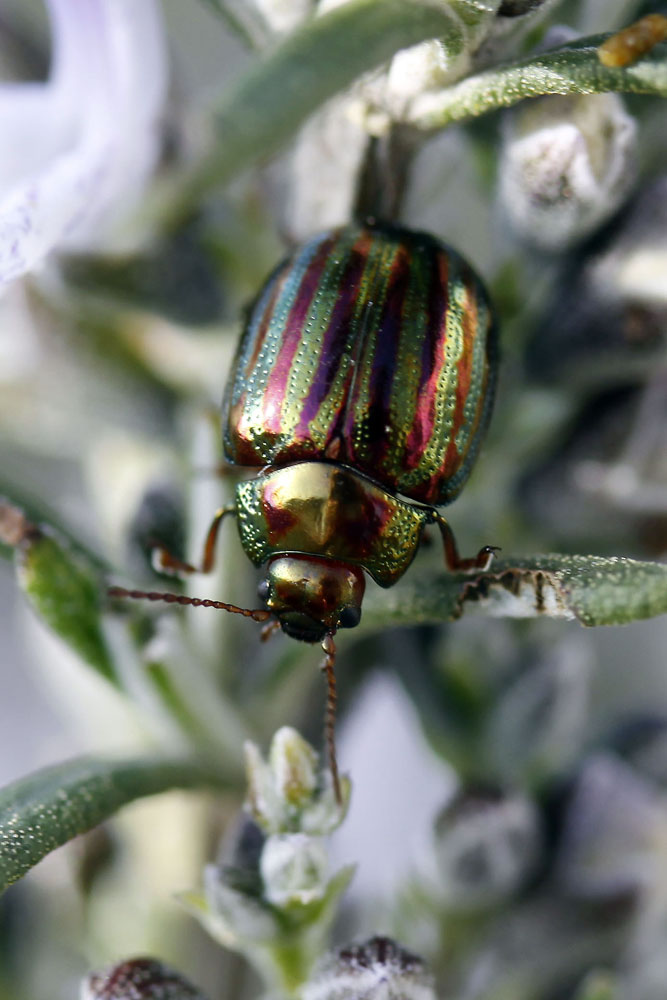
Rosemary beetle, on Rosmarinus officinalis in Molyvos, Greece

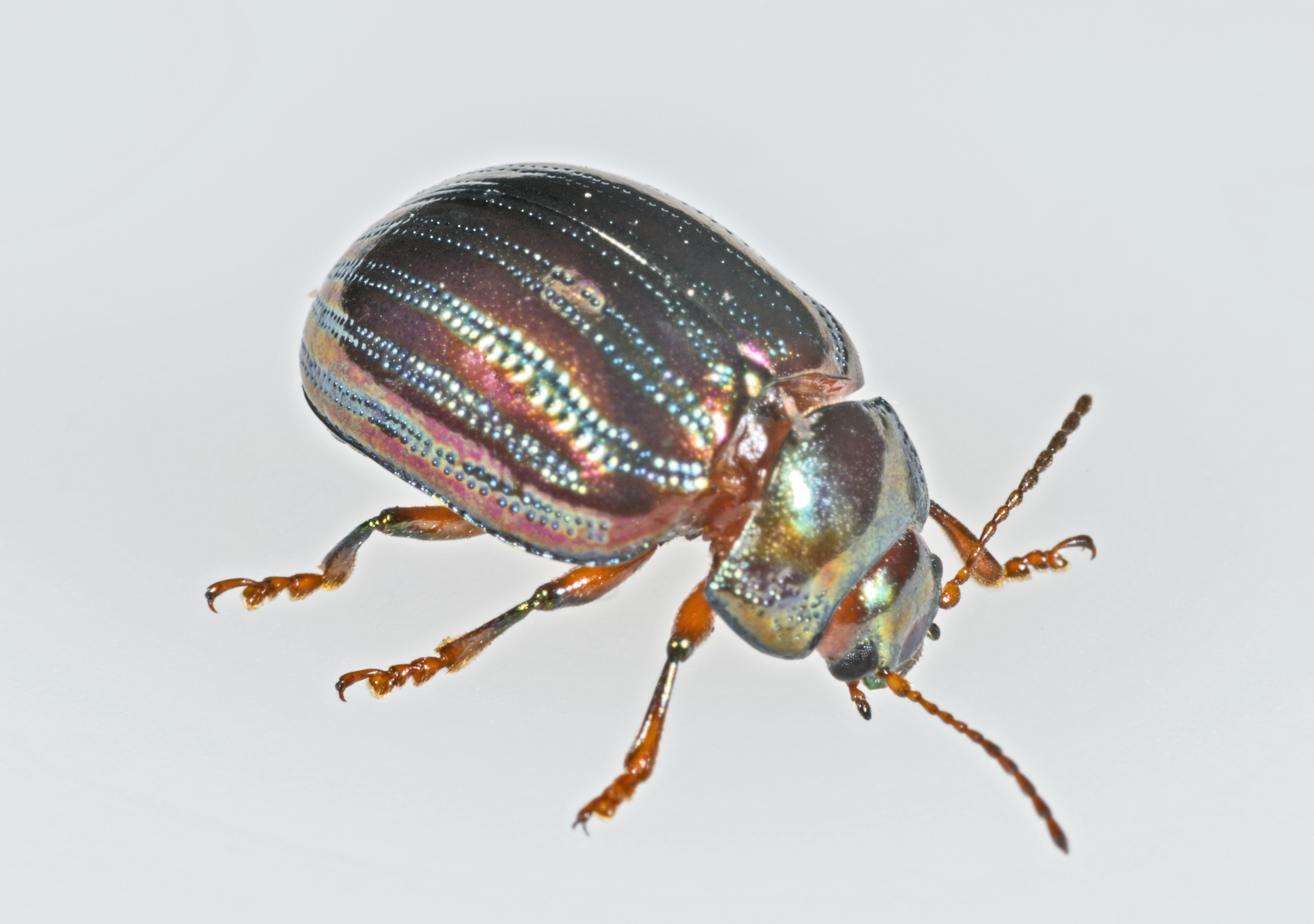
Image

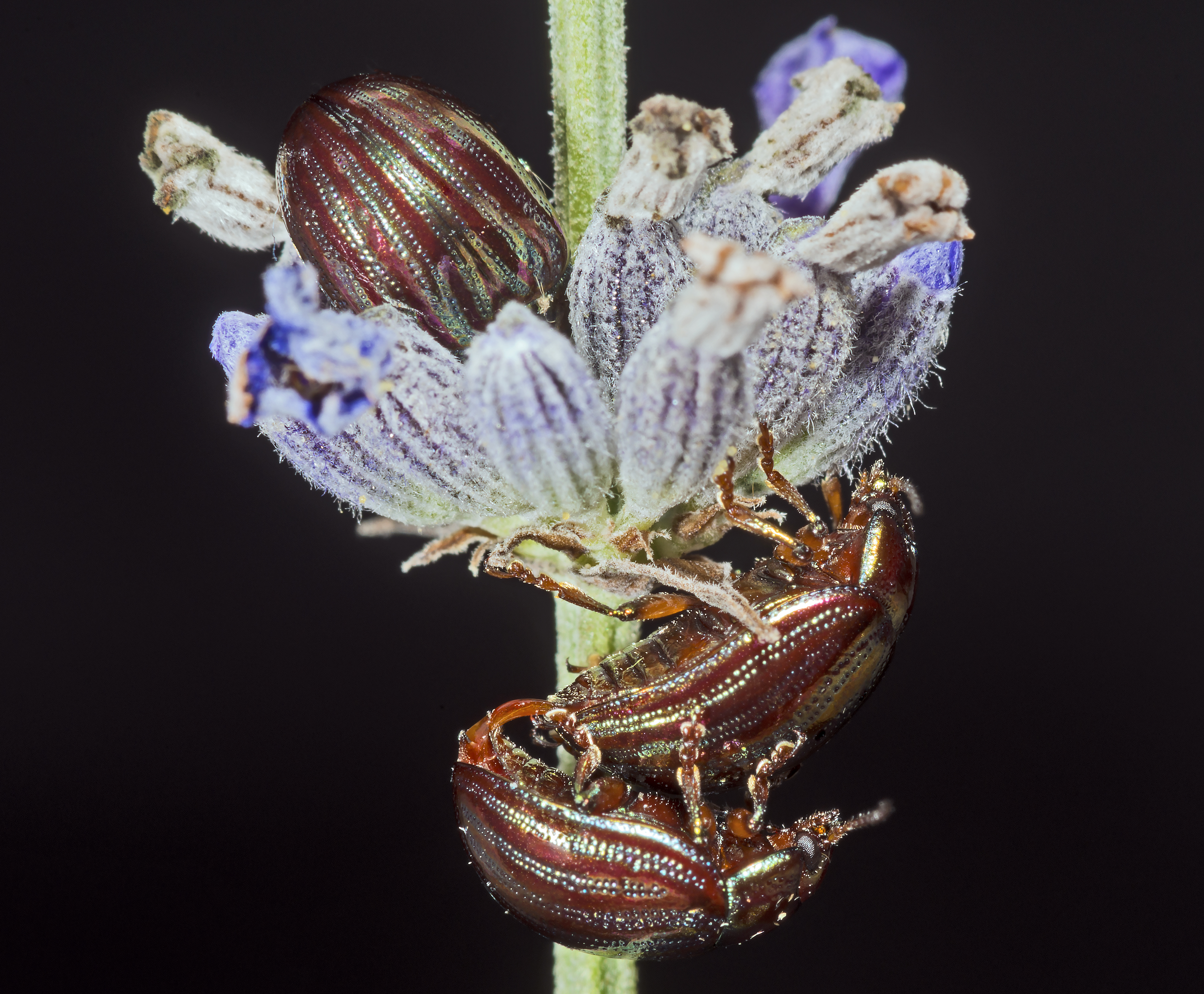
Mating

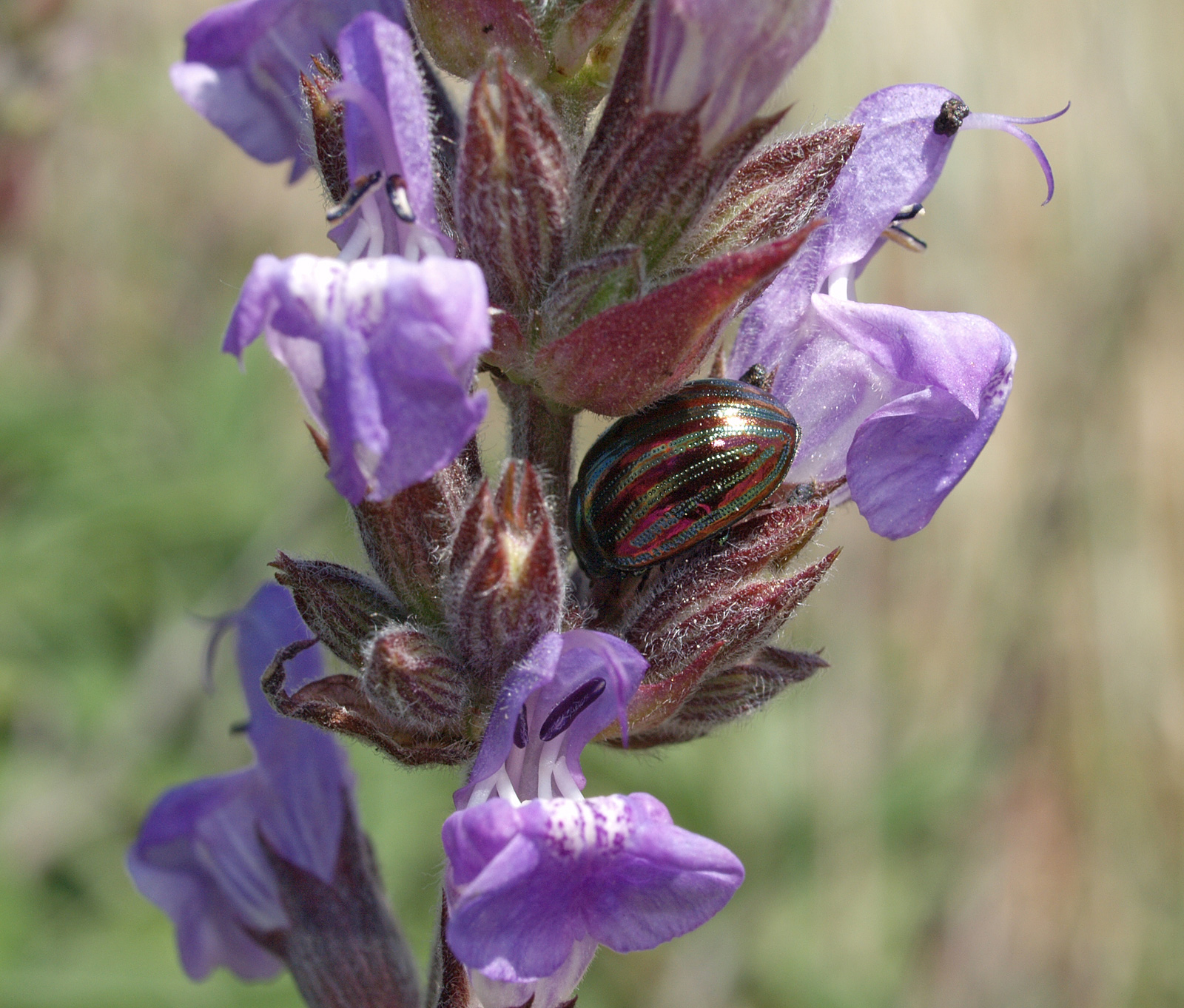
Chrysolina americana on Salvia

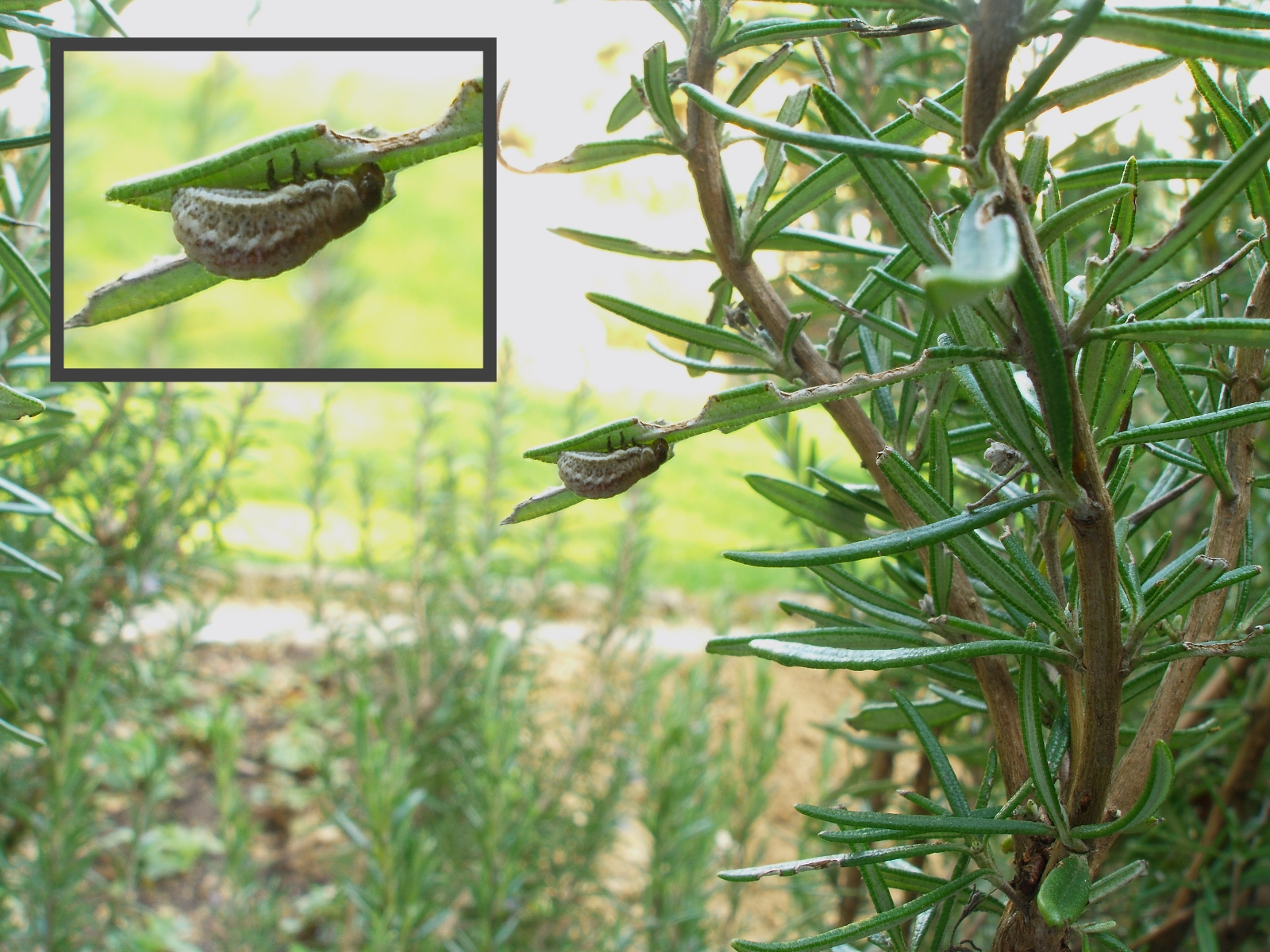
Larva on Rosmarinus officinalis

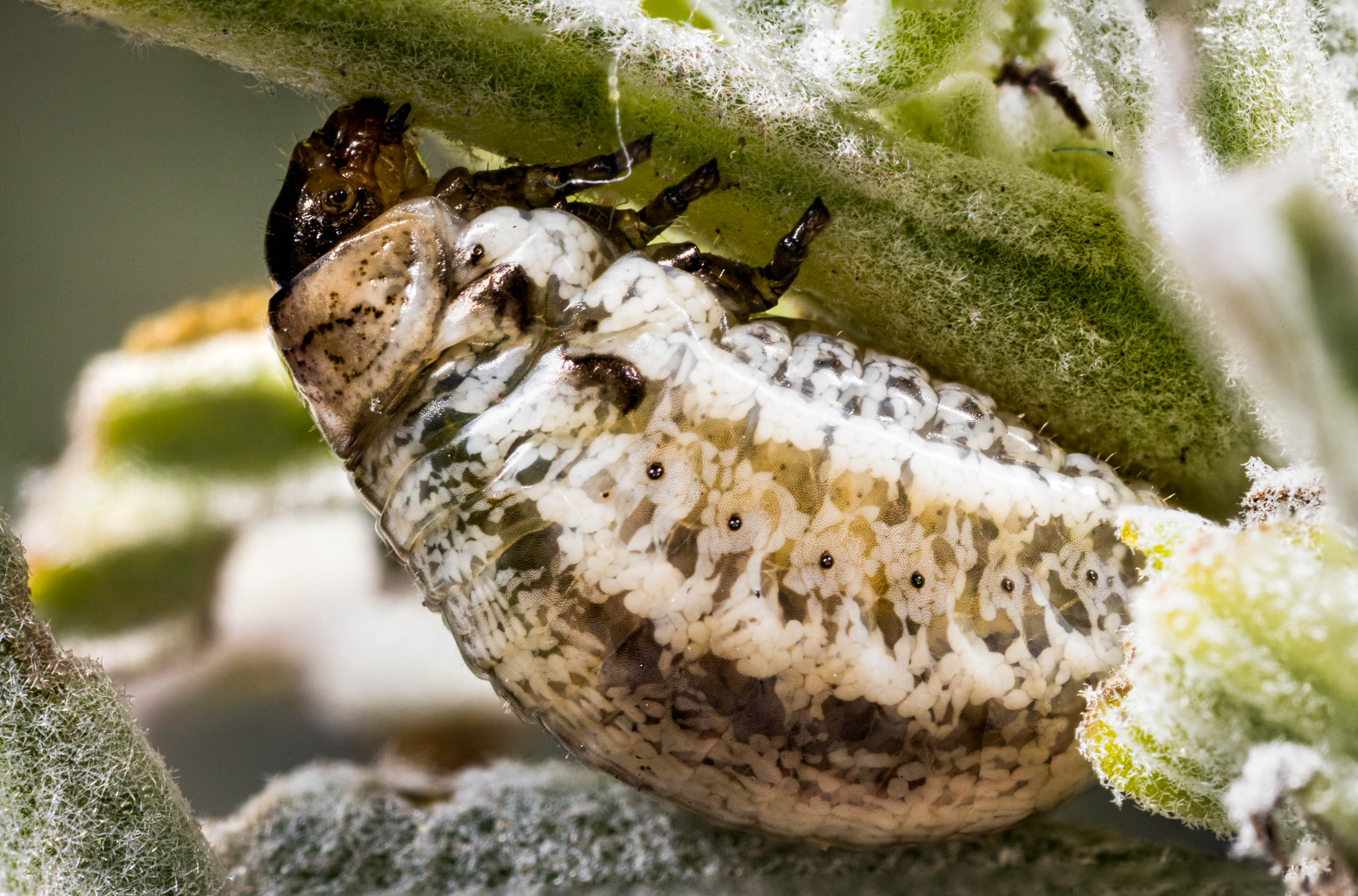
Larva on Lavandula angustifolia

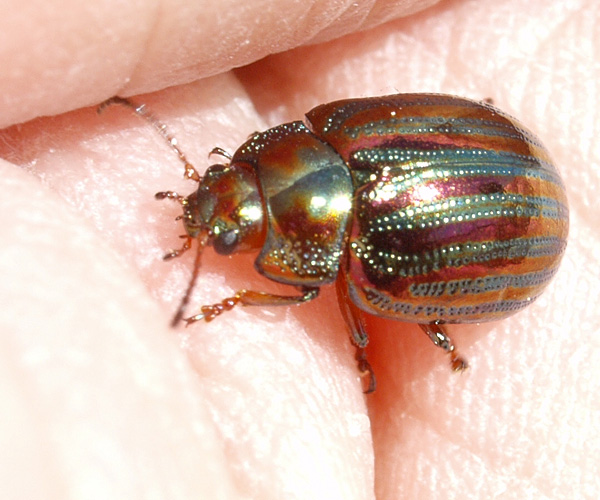
Rosemary beetle on hand
