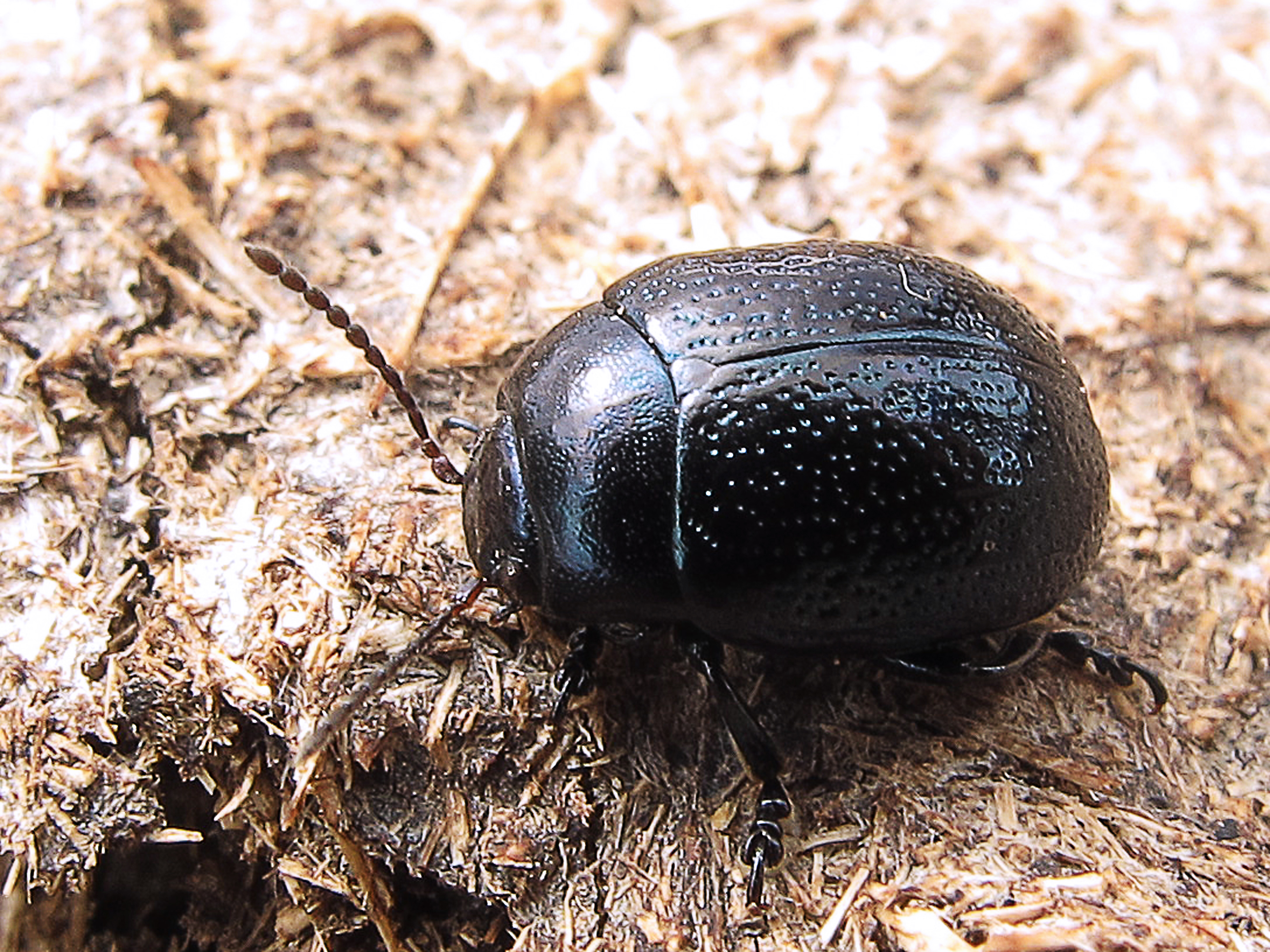

Scientific classification
- Kingdom: Animalia
- Phylum: Arthropoda
- Clade: Pancrustacea
- Class: Insecta
- Order: Coleoptera
- Suborder: Polyphaga
- Infraorder: Cucujiformia
- Family: Chrysomelidae
- Genus: Chrysolina
- Subgenus: Colaphodes; Motschulsky, 1860
- Species: C. haemoptera

Binomial name
- Chrysolina haemoptera (Linnaeus, 1758)

= Chrysolina haemoptera =

Species of beetle

Chrysolina haemoptera, also known as the plantain leaf beetle, is a species of leaf beetle in the genus Chrysolina. They are associated with plantains (Plantago), particularly Plantago coronopus.

== Description ==
C. haemoptera adult beetles measure 5.0–9.0 mm in length. They have a dull blue-black colouration without any metallic reflection.
