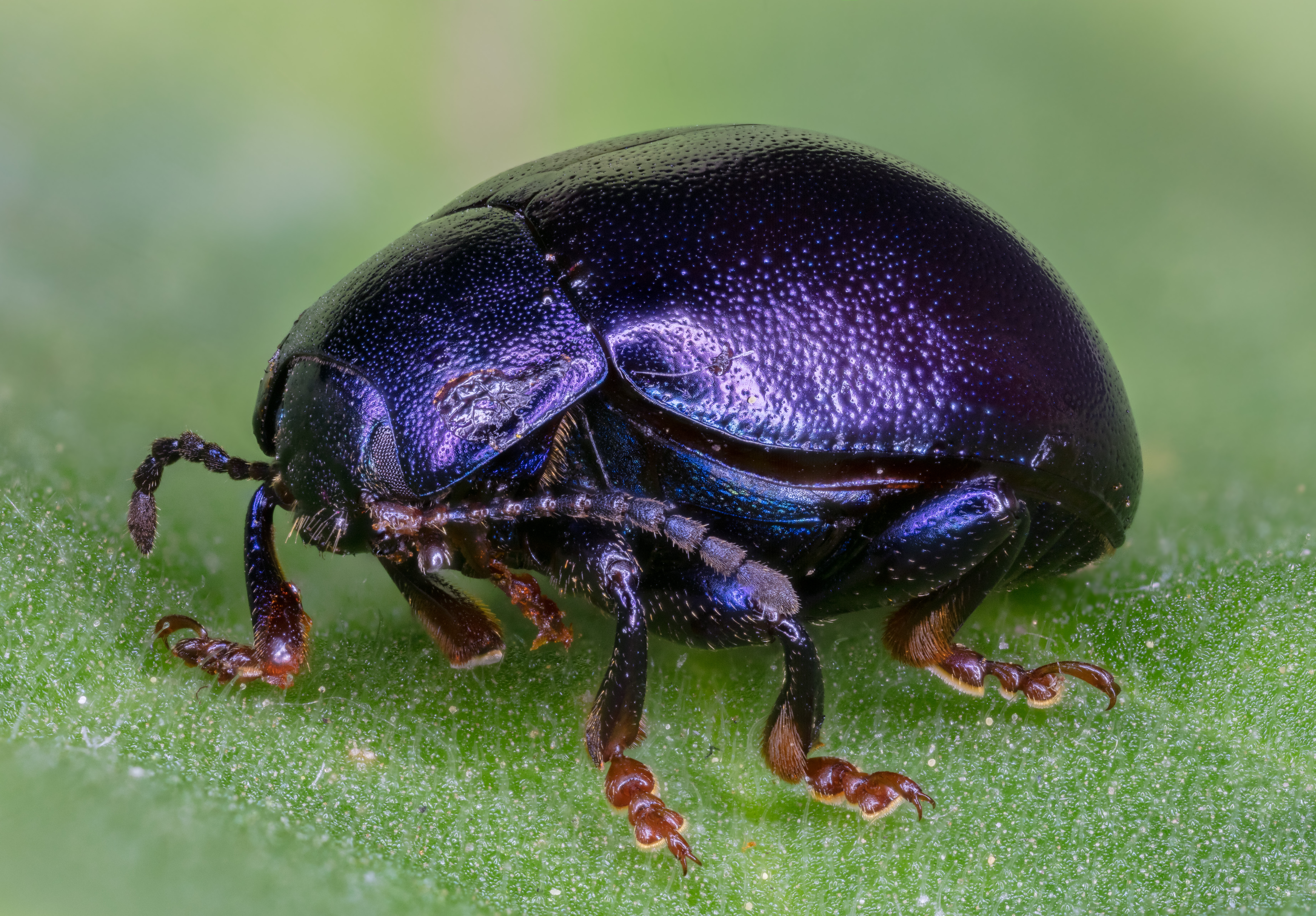

Scientific classification
- Kingdom: Animalia
- Phylum: Arthropoda
- Clade: Pancrustacea
- Class: Insecta
- Order: Coleoptera
- Suborder: Polyphaga
- Infraorder: Cucujiformia
- Family: Chrysomelidae
- Genus: Chrysolina
- Subgenus: Colaphosoma; Motschulsky, 1860
- Species: C. sturmi

Binomial name
- Chrysolina sturmi (Westhoff, 1882)

= Chrysolina sturmi =

Species of beetle

Chrysolina sturmi is a metallic purple beetle of the Chrysomelidae family, that can be found in Europe and Western Asia.

The beetle grows to 6–10 millimetres (0.24–0.39 in) in length.

They feed on Glechoma hederacea, Galium and Cirsium.
