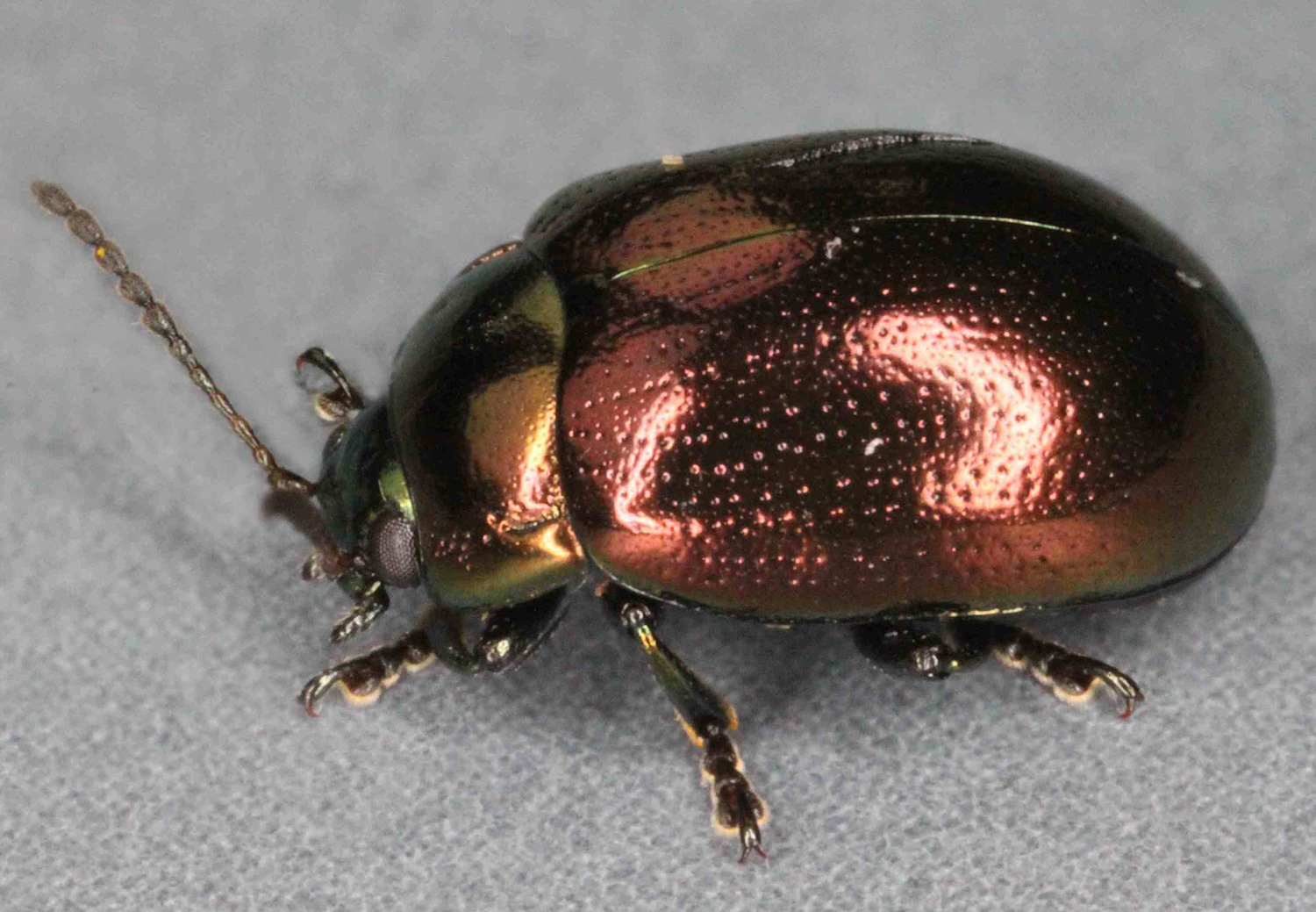

Scientific classification
- Kingdom: Animalia
- Phylum: Arthropoda
- Clade: Pancrustacea
- Class: Insecta
- Order: Coleoptera
- Suborder: Polyphaga
- Infraorder: Cucujiformia
- Family: Chrysomelidae
- Genus: Chrysolina
- Subgenus: Hypericia
- Species: C. brunsvicensis

Binomial name
- Chrysolina brunsvicensis (Gravenhorst, 1807)

Synonyms
- Chrysolina didymata

= Chrysolina brunsvicensis =

Species of beetle

Chrysolina brunsvicensis is a species of leaf beetle in the genus Chrysolina. It is associated with plants of the genus Hypericum.

== Description ==
C. brunsvicensis adult beetles measure 5.3–6.33 mm in length. They have a metallic, brassy colouration.
