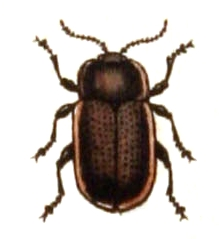

Scientific classification
- Kingdom: Animalia
- Phylum: Arthropoda
- Clade: Pancrustacea
- Class: Insecta
- Order: Coleoptera
- Suborder: Polyphaga
- Infraorder: Cucujiformia
- Family: Chrysomelidae
- Genus: Chrysolina
- Subgenus: Chalcoidea
- Species: C. marginata

Binomial name
- Chrysolina marginata (Linnaeus, 1758)

= Chrysolina marginata =

Species of beetle

Chrysolina marginata is a species of leaf beetle in the family Chrysomelidae.
