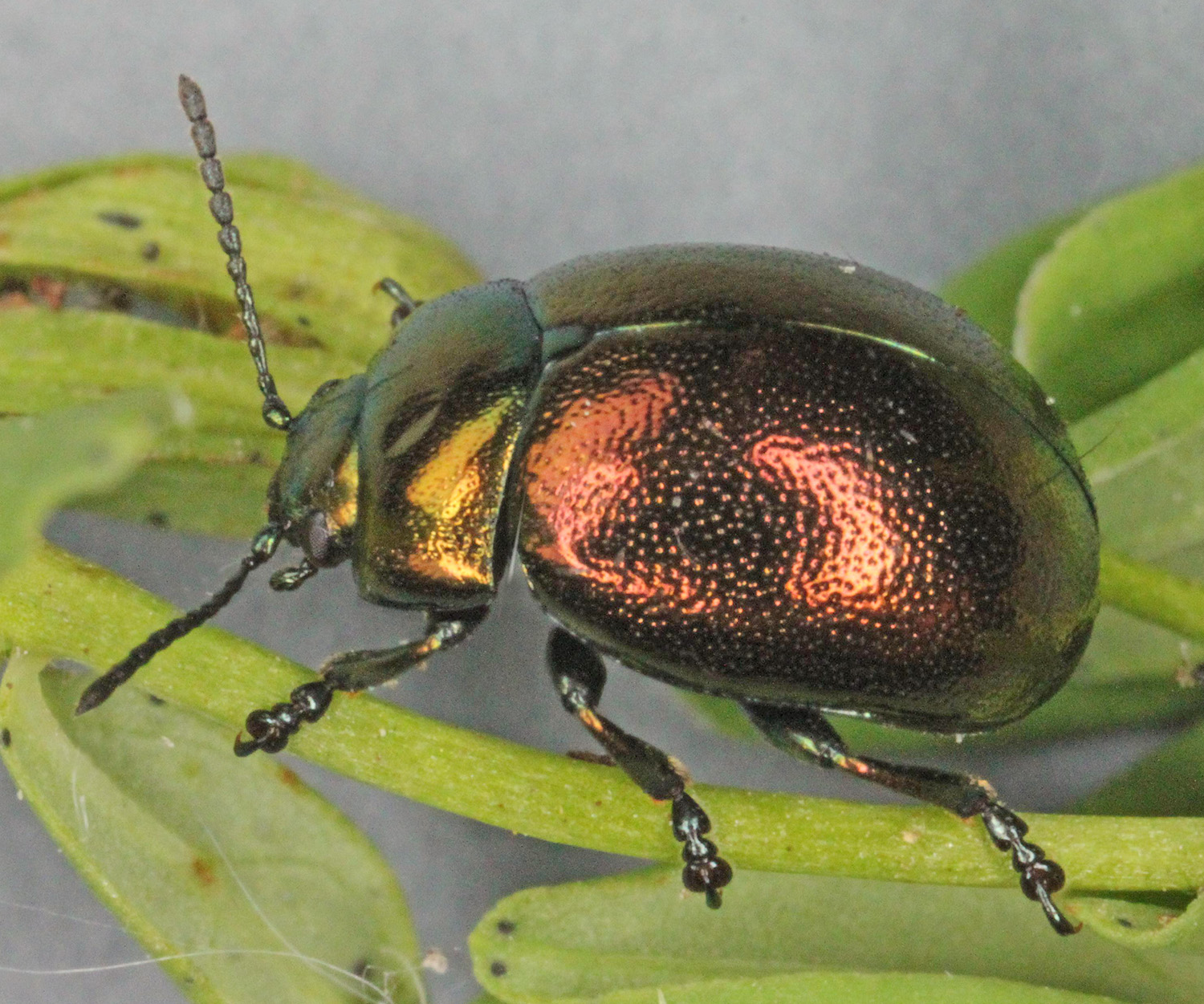

Scientific classification
- Kingdom: Animalia
- Phylum: Arthropoda
- Clade: Pancrustacea
- Class: Insecta
- Order: Coleoptera
- Suborder: Polyphaga
- Infraorder: Cucujiformia
- Family: Chrysomelidae
- Genus: Chrysolina
- Subgenus: Sphaeromela; Bedel, 1899
- Species: C. varians

Binomial name
- Chrysolina varians (Schaller, 1783)

= Chrysolina varians =

Species of beetle

Chrysolina varians is a species of leaf beetle native to Europe. It is the only member of the subgenus Sphaeromela in the genus Chrysolina.
