= Chrysolina lepida =

Scientific classification
- Kingdom: Animalia
- Phylum: Arthropoda
- Clade: Pancrustacea
- Class: Insecta
- Order: Coleoptera
- Suborder: Polyphaga
- Infraorder: Cucujiformia
- Family: Chrysomelidae
- Genus: Chrysolina
- Subgenus: Allochrysolina
- Species: C. lepida

Binomial name
- Chrysolina lepida (Olivier, 1807)

Synonyms
- Chrysomela fuliginosa (Olivier, 1807); Chrysomela opaca (Suffrian, 1853)

Species of beetle

Chrysolina lepida is a species of beetle from Chrysomelidae family, that could be found in Iberian Peninsula, Southern France, Italy, and Northwest Africa.

== Description ==
Both males and females are of the same length, but have different colour of legs. Females have orange, while males have black.
