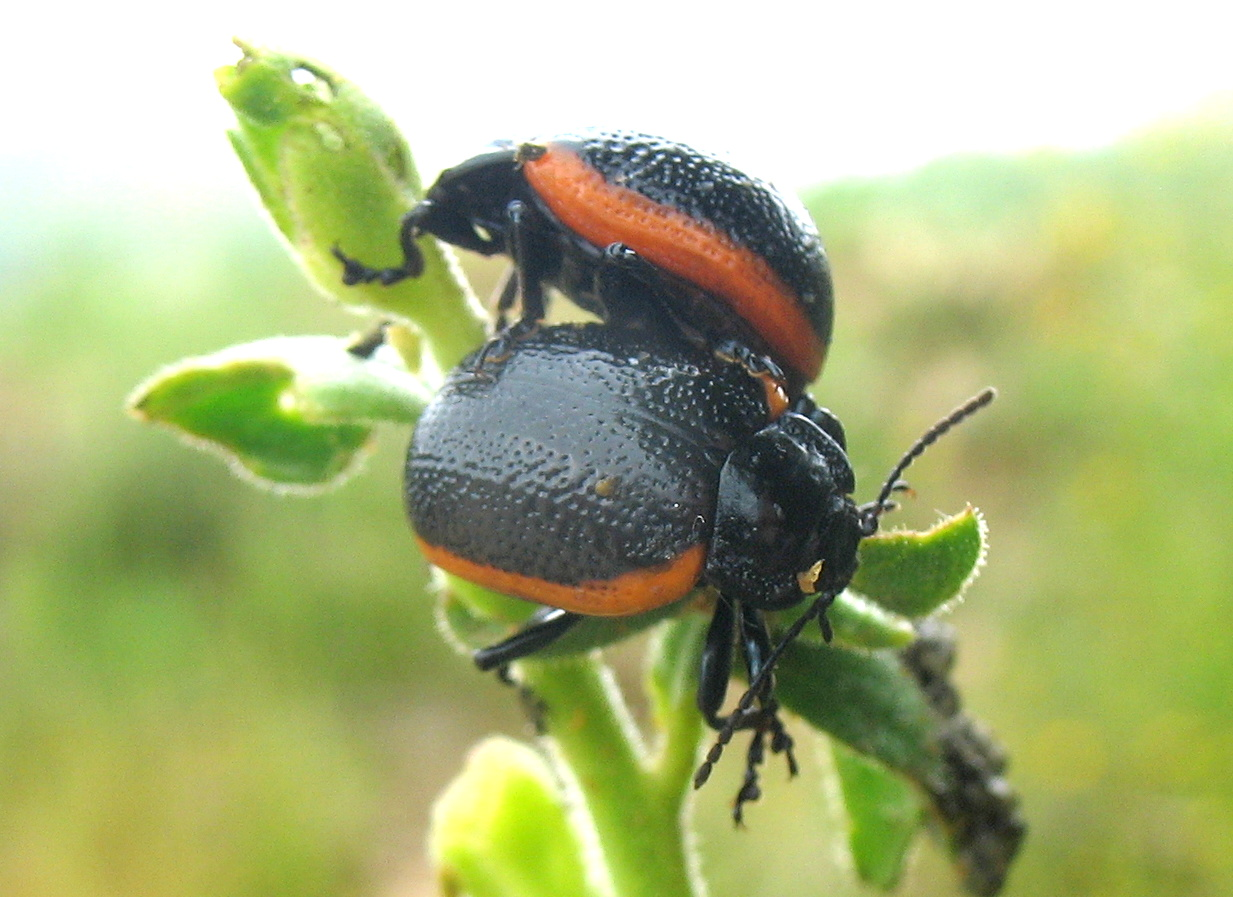

Scientific classification
- Kingdom: Animalia
- Phylum: Arthropoda
- Clade: Pancrustacea
- Class: Insecta
- Order: Coleoptera
- Suborder: Polyphaga
- Infraorder: Cucujiformia
- Family: Chrysomelidae
- Genus: Chrysolina
- Subgenus: Stichoptera
- Species: C. sanguinolenta

Binomial name
- Chrysolina sanguinolenta (Linnaeus, 1758)

= Chrysolina sanguinolenta =

Species of beetle

Chrysolina sanguinolenta is a species of leaf beetle native to Europe.
