= Chrysolina cinctipennis =

Scientific classification
- Kingdom: Animalia
- Phylum: Arthropoda
- Clade: Pancrustacea
- Class: Insecta
- Order: Coleoptera
- Suborder: Polyphaga
- Infraorder: Cucujiformia
- Family: Chrysomelidae
- Genus: Chrysolina
- Subgenus: Chalcoidea
- Species: C. cinctipennis

Binomial name
- Chrysolina cinctipennis (Harold, 1874)

Species of beetle

Chrysolina cinctipennis is a species of leaf beetles in Chrysomelidae family.

== Distribution ==
It lives near the basin Danube, in the Northeast Europe and Central Asia.
