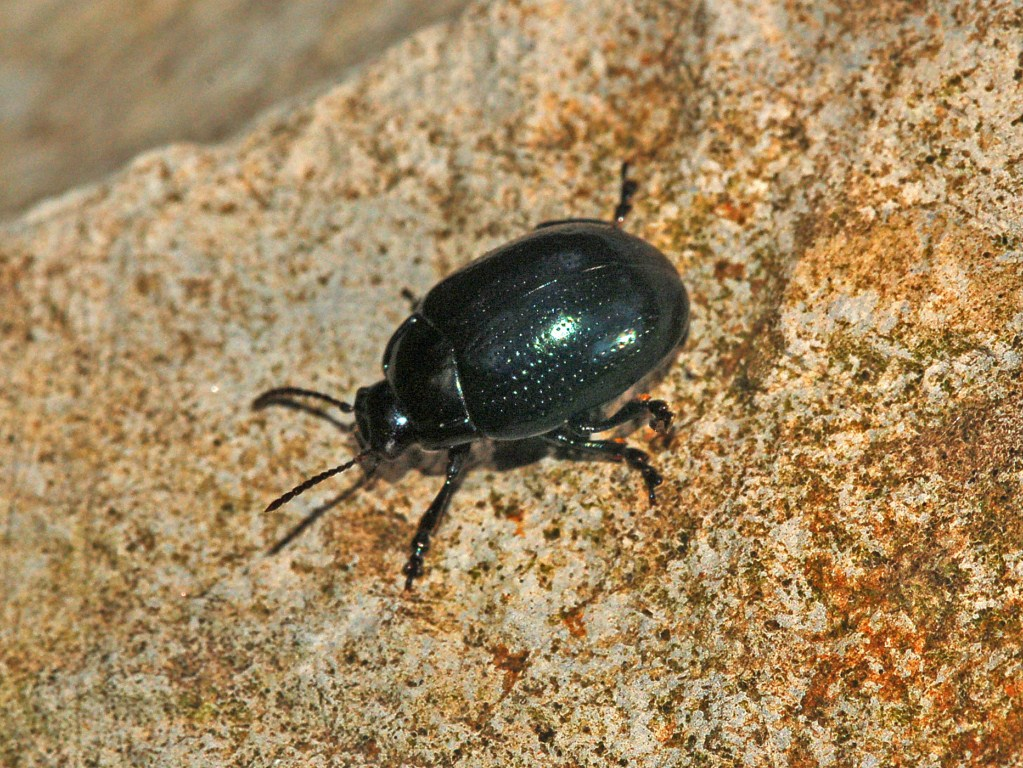

Scientific classification
- Kingdom: Animalia
- Phylum: Arthropoda
- Clade: Pancrustacea
- Class: Insecta
- Order: Coleoptera
- Suborder: Polyphaga
- Infraorder: Cucujiformia
- Family: Chrysomelidae
- Genus: Chrysolina
- Subgenus: Sulcicollis
- Species: C. oricalcia

Binomial name
- Chrysolina oricalcia (O. F. Muller, 1776)

Synonyms
- Chrysomela bulgarensis (Sckrank, 1781); Chrysomela oricalcea (Muller, 1776); Minckia oricalcea (Muller)

= Chrysolina oricalcia =

Species of beetle

Chrysolina oricalcea is a species of broad-shouldered leaf beetle of the family Chrysomelidae, subfamily Chrysomelinae.

Around 9 mm in length, it feeds on several plants of the Apiaceae species.

It is found in most Europe.
