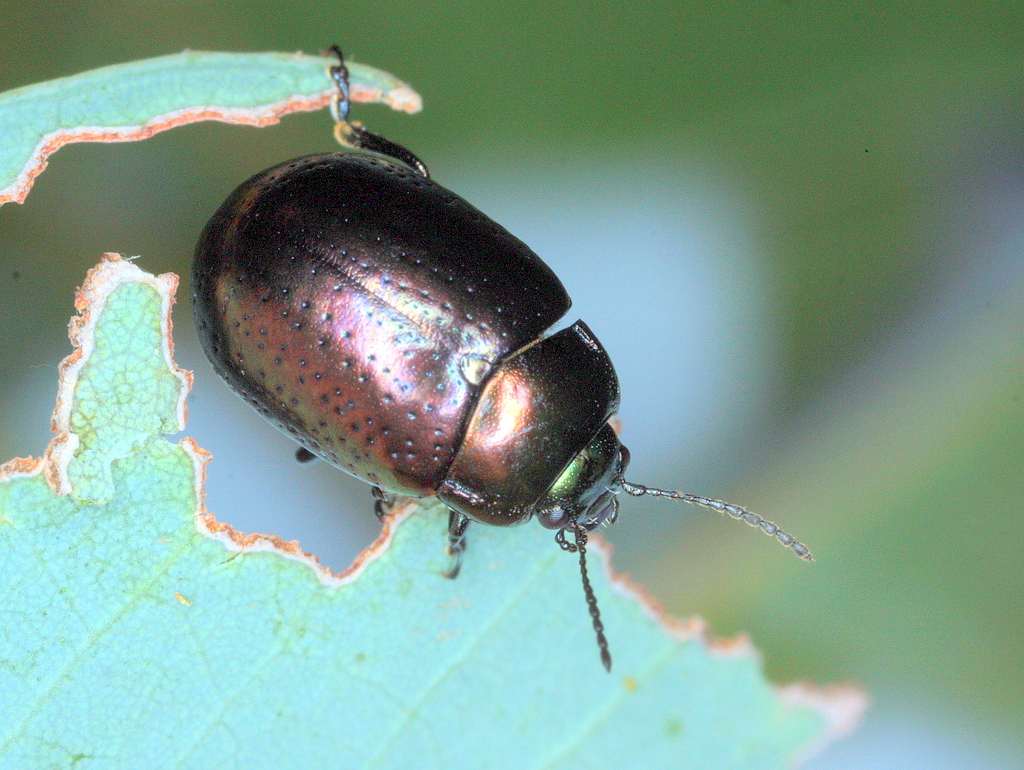

Scientific classification
- Kingdom: Animalia
- Phylum: Arthropoda
- Clade: Pancrustacea
- Class: Insecta
- Order: Coleoptera
- Suborder: Polyphaga
- Infraorder: Cucujiformia
- Family: Chrysomelidae
- Genus: Chrysolina
- Subgenus: Hypericia
- Species: C. quadrigemina

Binomial name
- Chrysolina quadrigemina (Suffrian, 1851)

= Chrysolina quadrigemina =

Species of beetle

Chrysolina quadrigemina, commonly known as the greater St. John's wort beetle, is a species of beetle of the family Chrysomelidae.

The species was described by Christian Wilhelm Ludwig Eduard Suffrian in 1851. It is native to Europe and North Africa.

It feeds on plants of the genus Hypericum, including the highly invasive St. John's wort (Hypericum perforatum). This plant is an introduced invasive pest in North America and Australia. The beetle was introduced in these regions as a biological control.

== Description ==
Chrysolina quadrigemina completes one lifecycle each year. They start with egg laying in the fall laying their eggs on the undersides of leaves of new fall basal growth on its host plant, St. John's Wort (Hypericum perforatum). The larvae feed on the plants at night for around one month before burying themselves in the soil to pupate. In this time they will often completely destroy the fall growth of their host plant. The insects remain in individual pupation chambers over the winter. In late spring the adults emerge to feed heavily on the plants just before or after they begin flowering, approximately April or May in California. They feed until high summer when they enter a period of hibernation (aestivation). Usually they find small crevices, hide under stones, or in soil cracks. In the fall they emerge to mate and begin the cycle again.
