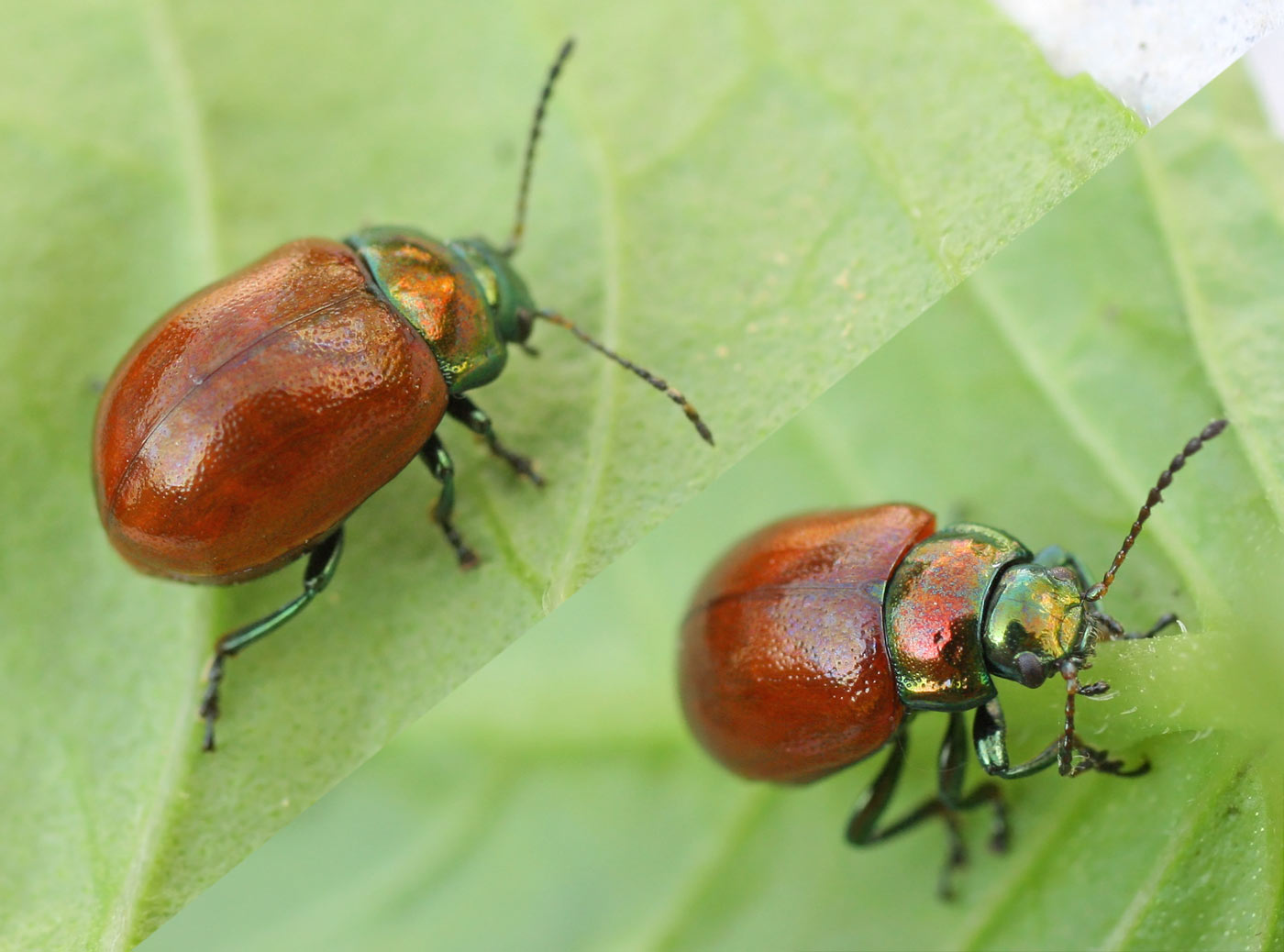
- Chrysolina polita

Scientific classification
- Kingdom: Animalia
- Phylum: Arthropoda
- Clade: Pancrustacea
- Class: Insecta
- Order: Coleoptera
- Suborder: Polyphaga
- Infraorder: Cucujiformia
- Superfamily: Chrysomeloidea
- Family: Chrysomelidae
- Subfamily: Chrysomelinae
- Tribe: Chrysomelini
- Genus: Chrysolina; Motschulsky, 1860

Type species
- Chrysomela staphylea Linnaeus, 1758

Subgenera
- Allochrysolina Bechyně, 1950; Allohypericia Bechyně, 1950; Anopachys Motschulsky, 1860; Apterosoma Motschulsky, 1860; Arctolina Kontkanen, 1959; Atechna Chevrolat, 1836; Atlasiana Bourdonne & Doguet, 1991; Bechynia Bourdonne, 1977; Bittotaenia Motschulsky, 1860; Cecchiniola Jacobson, 1908; Centoptera Motschulsky, 1860; Chalcoidea Motschulsky, 1860; Chersomela Weise, 1914; Chrysocrosita Bechyně, 1950; Chrysolina Motschulsky, 1860; Chrysolinopsis Bechyné, 1950; Chrysomorpha Motschulsky, 1860; Colaphodes Motschulsky, 1860; Colaphoptera Motschulsky, 1860; Colaphosoma Motschulsky, 1860; Crositops Marseul, 1883; Cyrtochrysolina Kippenberg in Kippenberg & Döberl, 1994; Diachalcoidea Bechyné, 1955; Erythrochrysa Bechyně, 1950; Euchrysolina Bechyně, 1950; Ghesquiereita Bechyně, 1950; Gnathomela Jacobson, 1895; Heliostola Motschulsky, 1860; Hypericia Bedel, 1898; Hypochalcoidea Bourdonne, 2012; Jeanclaudia Mikhailov, 2009; Liomela Weise, 1912; Lithopteroides Strand, 1935; Lopatinica Kippenberg, 2012; Maenadochrysa Bechyně, 1950; Medvedevlevna Özdikmen, 2008; Melasomoptera Bechyně, 1950; Naluhia Bechyné, 1948; Omolina Weise in Sjöstedt, 1909; Ovosoma Motschulsky, 1860; Ovostoma Motschulsky, 1860; Palaeosticta Bechyné, 1952; Paracrosita Daccordi, 1982; Paramenthastriella Daccordi, 1980; Pezocrosita Jacobson, 1901; Pierryvettia Bechyně, 1950; Pleurosticha Motschulsky, 1860; Polystictella Bechyné, 1952; Pseudocrosita Lopatin, 1999; Pseudolithoptera Medvedev, 1970; Pseudotimarchomima Daccordi, 1980; Rhyssoloma Wollaston, 1854; Semenowia Weise, 1889; Sibiriella Medvedev, 1999; Sphaerochrysolina Kippenberg, 2010; Sphaeromela Bedel, 1901; Stichoptera Motschulsky, 1860; Sulcicollis Sahlberg, 1913; Synerga Weise, 1900; Taeniochrysea Bechyně, 1950; Taeniosticha Motschulsky, 1860; Threnosoma Motschulsky, 1860; Timarchida Ganglbauer, 1897; Timarcholina Bechyně, 1950; Timarchomela Achard, 1922; Timarchoptera Motschulsky, 1860; Upseleatlasia Bourdonne, 2012; Vittatochrysa Lopatin, 1977; Zeugotaenia Motschulsky, 1860

Diversity
- at least 130 species

Synonyms
- Altailina Mikhailov, 2000; Anapachys Motschulsky, 1860; Bechynea Medvedev, 1966; Bourdonneana Kippenberg in Löbl & Danilevsky, 2010; Camerounia Jolivet, 1949; Caudatochrysa Bechyně, 1950; Chesomela Weise, 1918; Cobosorina David, 1953; Colophodes Motschulsky, 1860; Craspeda Motschulsky, 1860; Dlochrysa Motschulsky, 1860; Drochrysa Kimoto, 1964; Ghesquièreita Bechyně, 1950; Ghesquierita Bechyně, 1950; Ghesquièrita Bechyně, 1950; Hoplosoma Motschulsky, 1860; Jacobsonia Medvedev, 1970; Lithoptera Motschulsky, 1860; Litoptheroides Bechyne, 1950; Menthastriella Bechyně, 1950; Mimophaedon Bourdonne, 1996; Minckia Strand, 1935; Oreina Monros & Bechyne, 1956; Ovomorpha Motschulsky, 1860; Pachygnatha Weise, 1892; Palaeostricta Seeno, 1976; Paradiachalcoida Daccordi, 1978; Paradiachalcoidea Daccordi, 1978; Parkaniola Bechyně, 1950; Pirryvittia Kimoto, 1964; Polysticha Gressitt & Kimoto, 1963; Polysticta Hope, 1840; Pseudotaeniochrysea Daccordi, 1980; Stichosoma Motschulsky, 1860; Timarchomima Bechyně, 1950

= Chrysolina =

Genus of beetles

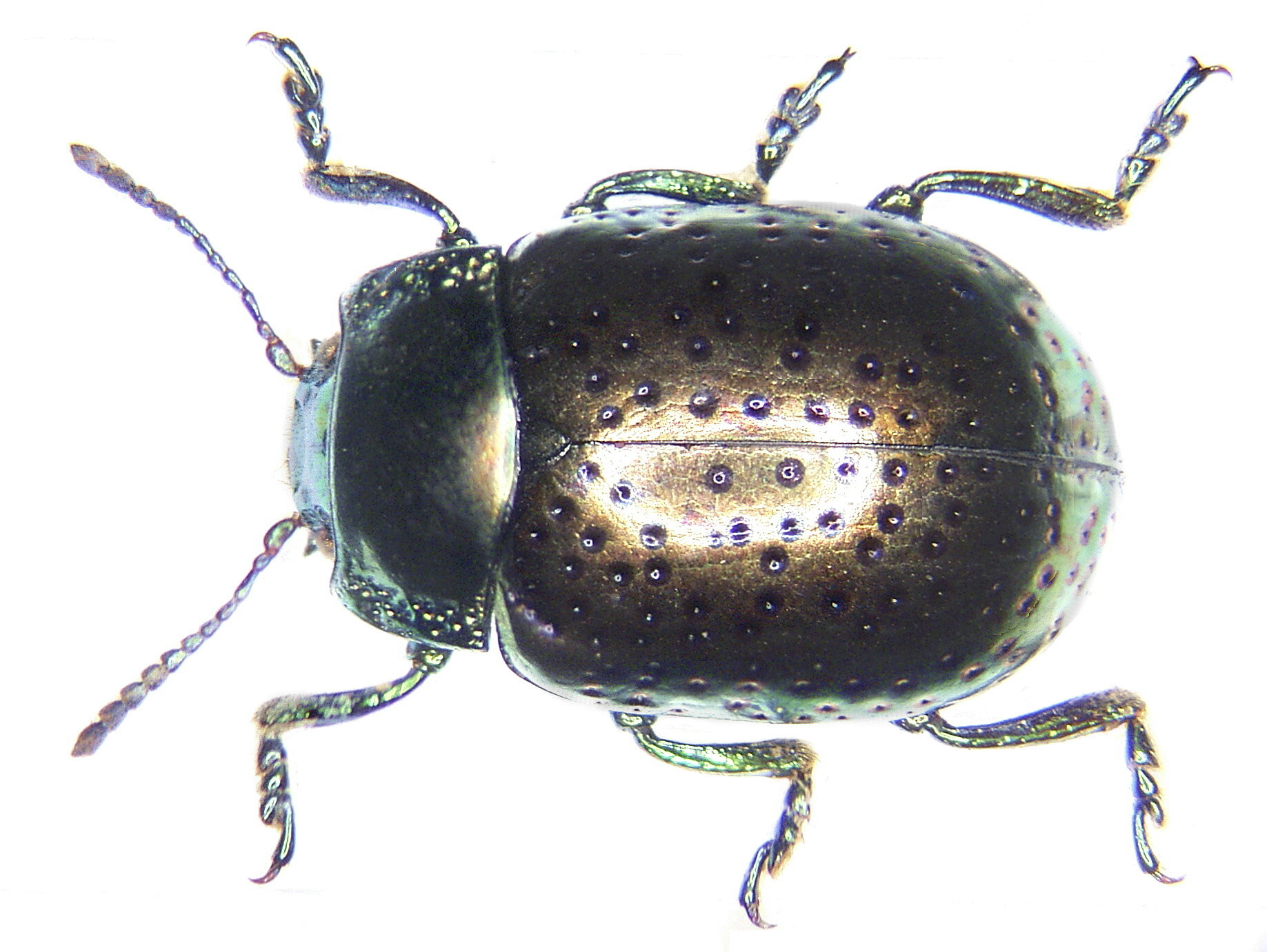
Chrysolina bicolor

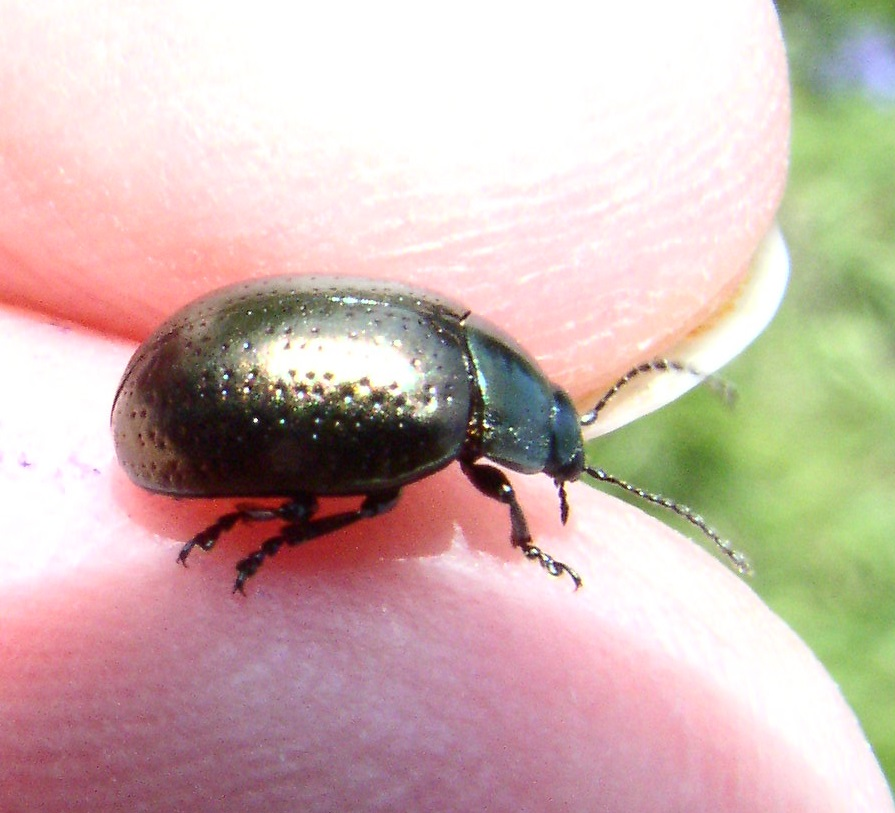
C. hyperici

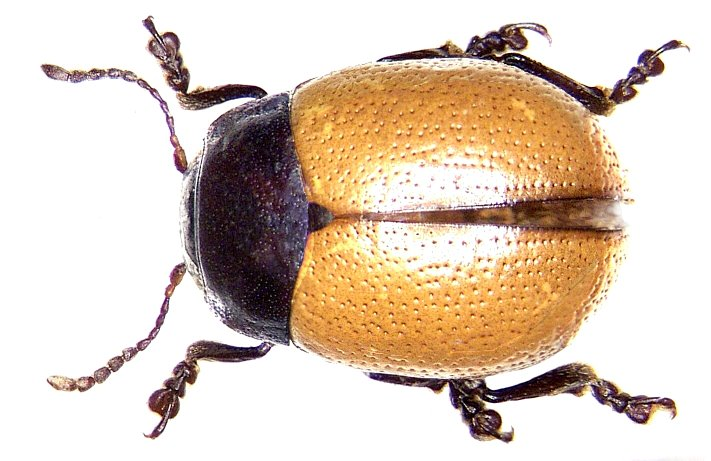
Chrysolina numida

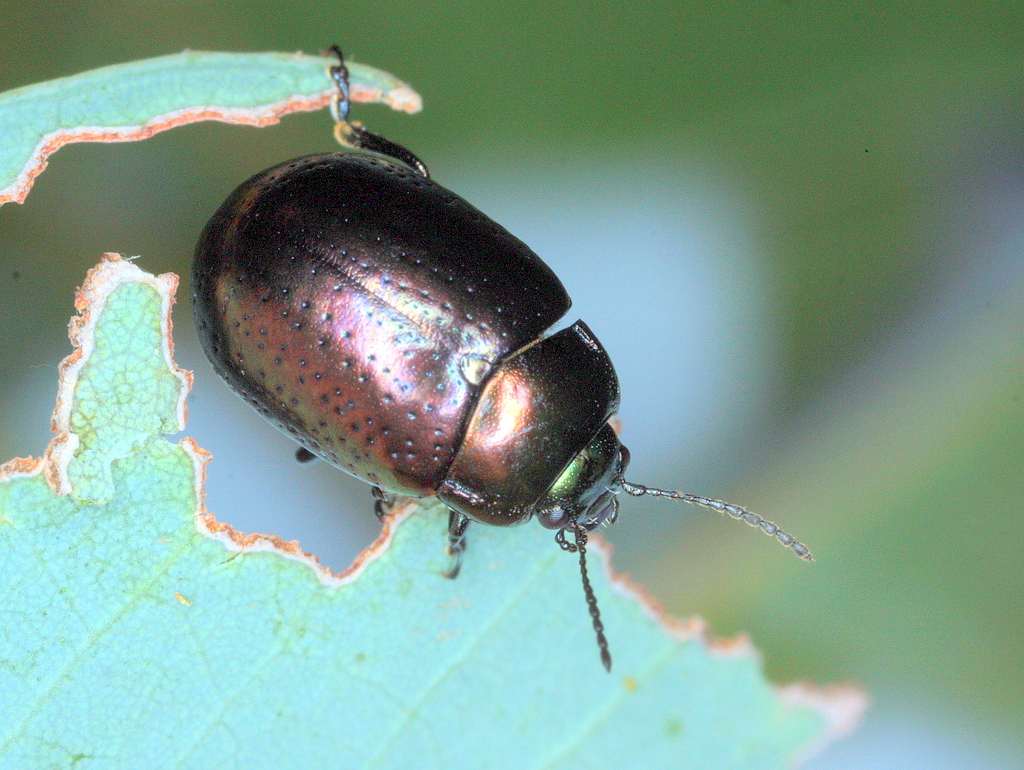
Chrysolina quadrigemina

Chrysolina is a large genus of leaf beetles in the subfamily Chrysomelinae. Most species are distributed in Europe, Asia and Africa with a small number of species inhabiting North America (including introduced European ones) and introduced species in Australia.

The species Chrysolina cerealis and C. graminis are protected in the United Kingdom. All species of Chrysolina are phytophagous, feeding on specific food plants, and some of them have been used for biological control of weeds. To control Hypericum perforatum (St John's wort), C. hyperici was successfully naturalized in Australia in the 1930s and several species, especially C. quadrigemina, were introduced to California in the late 1940s.

== Systematic classification of European species ==
- Order Coleoptera
  Suborder Polyphaga
  Superfamily Chrysomeloidea Latreille, 1802
  Family Chrysomelidae Latreille, 1802
  Subfamily Chrysomelinae Latreille, 1802
  Genus Chrysolina Motschulsky, 1860
  Subgenus Allochrysolina
  Chrysolina fuliginosa (Olivier, 1807)
  Chrysolina lepida (Olivier 1807)
  Subgenus Anopachys
  Chrysolina aurichalcea (Mannerheim, 1825)
  Chrysolina eurina (Frivaldszky, 1883)
  Chrysolina relucens (Rosenhauer, 1847)
  Chrysolina schatzmayri (Muller, 1916)
  Subgenus Arctolina
  Chrysolina septentrionalis (Menetries, 1851)
  Subgenus Bechynia
  Chrysolina milleri (Weise, 1884)
  Chrysolina philotesia Daccordi & Ruffo, 1980
  Chrysolina platypoda (Bechyné, 1950)
  Chrysolina substrangulata Bourdonne, 1986
  Subgenus Bittotaenia
  Chrysolina salviae (Germar, 1824)
  Subgenus Cecchiniola
  Chrysolina platyscelidina (Jacobson, 1898)
  Subgenus Centoptera
  Chrysolina bicolor (Fabricius, 1775)
  Subgenus Chalcoidea
  Chrysolina analis (Linnaeus, 1767)
  Chrysolina carnifex (Fabricius, 1792)
  Chrysolina carnifex melanaria (Suffrian, 1851)
  Chrysolina cinctipennis (Harold, 1874)
  Chrysolina curvilinea (Weise, 1884)
  Chrysolina hyrcana (Weise, 1884)
  Chrysolina interstincta (Suffrian, 1851)
  Chrysolina marginata (Linnaeus, 1758)
  Chrysolina taygetana Bechyné, 1952
  Subgenus Chrysolina
  Chrysolina bankii (Fabricius, 1775)
  Chrysolina costalis (Olivier, 1807)
  Chrysolina fortunata (Wollaston, 1864)
  Chrysolina obsoleta (Brulle, 1838)
  Chrysolina rufa (Duftschmid, 1825)
  Chrysolina staphylaea (Linnaeus, 1758)
  Chrysolina wollastoni Bechyné, 1957
  Subgenus Chrysomorpha
  Chrysolina cerealis (Linnaeus, 1767)
  Subgenus Colaphodes
  Chrysolina haemoptera (Linnaeus, 1758)
  Subgenus Colaphoptera
  Chrysolina globosa (Panzer, 1805)
  Chrysolina pliginskii (Reitter, 1913)
  Chrysolina purpurascens (Germar, 1822)
  Subgenus Colaphosoma
  Chrysolina sturmi (Westhoff, 1882)
  Subgenus Craspeda
  Chrysolina jenisseiensis (Breit, 1920)
  Chrysolina limbata (Fabricius, 1775)
  Subgenus Cyrtochrysolina
  Chrysolina marcasitica (Germar, 1824)
  Subgenus Erythrochrysa
  Chrysolina polita (Linnaeus, 1758)
  Subgenus Euchrysolina
  Chrysolina graminis (Linnaeus, 1758)
  Chrysolina virgata (Motschulsky, 1860)
  Subgenus Heliostola
  Chrysolina carpathica (Fuss, 1856)
  Chrysolina lichenis (Richter, 1820)
  Chrysolina schneideri (Weise, 1882)
  Subgenus Hypericia
  Chrysolina brunsvicensis (Gravenhorst, 1807)
  Chrysolina corcyria (Suffrian, 1851)
  Chrysolina cuprina (Duftschmid, 1825)
  Chrysolina didymata (Scriba, 1791)
  Chrysolina geminata (Paykull, 1799)
  Chrysolina hyperici (Forster, 1771)
  Chrysolina quadrigemina (Suffrian, 1851)
  Subgenus Maenadochrysa
  Chrysolina affinis (Fabricius, 1787)
  Chrysolina aveyronenesis Bechyné, 1950
  Chrysolina baetica (Suffrian, 1851)
  Chrysolina femoralis (Olivier, 1790)
  Subgenus Melasomoptera
  Chrysolina grossa (Fabricius, 1792)
  Chrysolina lucida (Olivier, 1807)
  Chrysolina lutea (Petagna, 1819)
  Subgenus Mimophaedon
  Chrysolina pourtoyi Bourdonne, 1996
  Subgenus Ovosoma
  Chrysolina atrovirens (Frivaldszky, 1876)
  Chrysolina cretica (Olivier, 1807)
  Chrysolina halysa Bechyné, 1950
  Chrysolina orientalis (Olivier, 1807)
  Chrysolina rhodia Bechyné, 1950
  Chrysolina sahlbergi (Menetries, 1832)
  Chrysolina susterai Bechyné, 1950
  Chrysolina turca (Fairmaire, 1865)
  Chrysolina vernalis (Brulle, 1832)
  Subgenus Ovostoma
  Chrysolina globipennis (Suffrian, 1851)
  Chrysolina olivieri (Bedel, 1892)
  Subgenus Palaeosticta
  Chrysolina diluta (Germar, 1824)
  Subgenus Rhyssoloma
  Chrysolina fragariae (Wollaston, 1854)
  Subgenus Sphaerochrysolina
  Chrysolina umbratilis (Weise, 1887)
  Subgenus Sphaeromela
  Chrysolina varians (Schaller, 1783)
  Subgenus Stichoptera
  Chrysolina colasi (Cobos, 1952)
  Chrysolina grancanariensis (Lindberg, 1953)
  Chrysolina gypsophilae (Kuster, 1845)
  Chrysolina latecincta (Demaison, 1896)
  Chrysolina kuesteri (Helliesen, 1912)
  Chrysolina lucidicollis (Kuster, 1845)
  Chrysolina mactata (Fairmaire, 1859)
  Chrysolina rossia (Illiger, 1802)
  Chrysolina sanguinolenta (Linnaeus, 1758)
  Chrysolina stachydis (Gene, 1839)
  Chrysolina variolosa (Petagna, 1819)
  Subgenus Sulcicollis
  Chrysolina chalcites (Germar, 1824)
  Chrysolina oricalcia (Muller O. F., 1776)
  Chrysolina peregrina (Herrich-Schaeffer, 1839)
  Chrysolina rufoaenea (Suffrian, 1851)
  Subgenus Synerga
  Chrysolina coerulans (Scriba, 1791)
  Chrysolina herbacea (Duftschmid, 1825)
  Chrysolina suffriani (Fairmaire, 1859)
  Chrysolina viridana (Kuster, 1844)
  Subgenus Taeniochrysea
  Chrysolina americana (Linnaeus, 1758)
  Subgenus Taeniosticha
  Chrysolina reitteri (Weise, 1884)
  Subgenus Threnosoma
  Chrysolina cribrosa (Ahrens, 1812)
  Chrysolina fimbrialis (Kuster, 1845)
  Chrysolina helopioides (Suffrian, 1851)
  Chrysolina inflata (Weise, 1916)
  Chrysolina joliveti Bechyné, 1950
  Chrysolina obenbergeri Bechyné, 1950
  Chrysolina obscurella (Suffrian, 1851)
  Chrysolina osellai (Daccordi & Ruffo, 1979)
  Chrysolina tagana (Suffrian, 1851)
  Chrysolina timarchoides (Brisout, 1882)
  Chrysolina weisei (Frivaldszky, 1883)
  Subgenus Timarchida
  Chrysolina deubeli (Ganglbauer, 1897)

== See also ==
- List of Chrysolina species
