= List of insects of Metropolitan France =

Insects found in Metropolitan France include:

== Beetles ==
- Donacia brevitarsis and Donacia malinovskyi, leaf beetles of the genus Donacia
- Lucanus cervus, the stag beetle

== Flies ==
- Musca domestica, the house fly
- Aedes albopictus

== Butterflies and moths ==
- List of butterflies of Metropolitan France
- List of moths of Metropolitan France (A–C)
- List of moths of Metropolitan France (D–H)
- List of moths of Metropolitan France (I–O)
- List of moths of Metropolitan France (P–Z)

== Mantises ==
- Iris oratoria

== Odonates (dragonflies and damselflies) ==
- List of Odonata species of Metropolitan France

== Stick insects ==
- Bacillus rossius
- Clonopsis gallica

== See also ==
- Fauna of Metropolitan France
