= Donacia brevicornis =

Scientific classification
- Kingdom: Animalia
- Phylum: Arthropoda
- Class: Insecta
- Order: Coleoptera
- Suborder: Polyphaga
- Infraorder: Cucujiformia
- Family: Chrysomelidae
- Genus: Donacia
- Species: D. brevicornis

Binomial name
- Donacia brevicornis Ahrens, 1810

Species of beetle

Donacia brevicornis is a species of leaf beetle of the subfamily Donaciinae. It is found in northern and north-central Europe.
