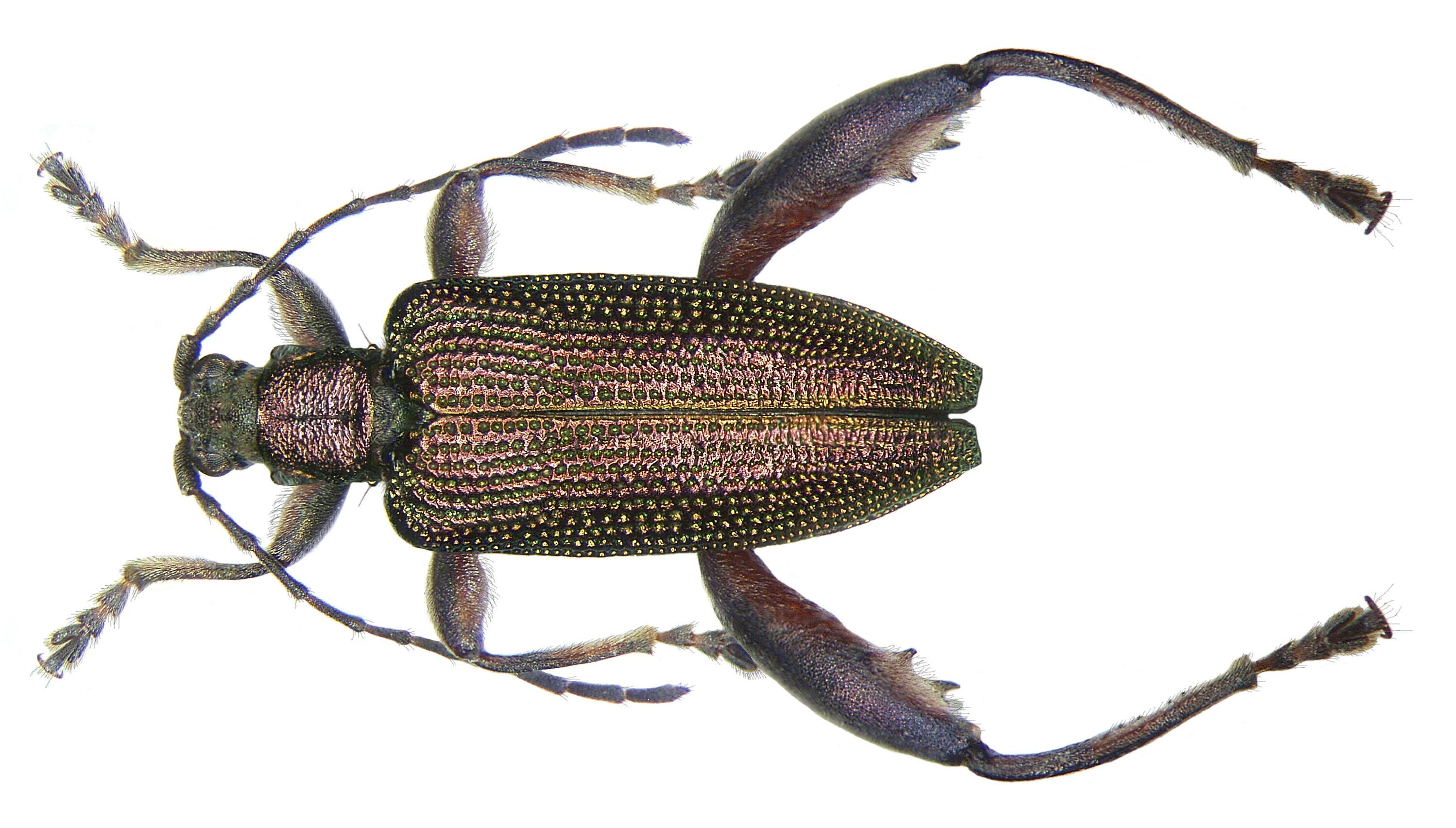

Scientific classification
- Kingdom: Animalia
- Phylum: Arthropoda
- Class: Insecta
- Order: Coleoptera
- Suborder: Polyphaga
- Infraorder: Cucujiformia
- Family: Chrysomelidae
- Genus: Donacia
- Species: D. dentata

Binomial name
- Donacia dentata Hoppe, 1795

= Donacia dentata =

Species of beetle

Donacia dentata is a species of leaf beetles of the subfamily Donaciinae.

== Ecology and habitats ==
Adult beetles feed on leaves of the Alisma and Sagittaria sagittifolia plants. The beetles may also feed on pollen (especially Nuphar lutea). Pupae develop among the developing roots within the coastal land, in the roots of plants such as sagittaria and common species of the genus Cyperaceae (Carex). Larvae feed on leaves and roots of the sagittaria and the roots of different species of cyperaceae.
