= Donacia antiqua =

Scientific classification
- Kingdom: Animalia
- Phylum: Arthropoda
- Class: Insecta
- Order: Coleoptera
- Suborder: Polyphaga
- Infraorder: Cucujiformia
- Family: Chrysomelidae
- Genus: Donacia
- Species: D. antiqua

Binomial name
- Donacia antiqua Kunze, 1818

Species of beetle

Donacia antiqua is a species of leaf beetles of the subfamily Donaciinae. They are found mainly in Estonia, Finland Latvia and Sweden, and specimens have been found in Central Europe and France.
