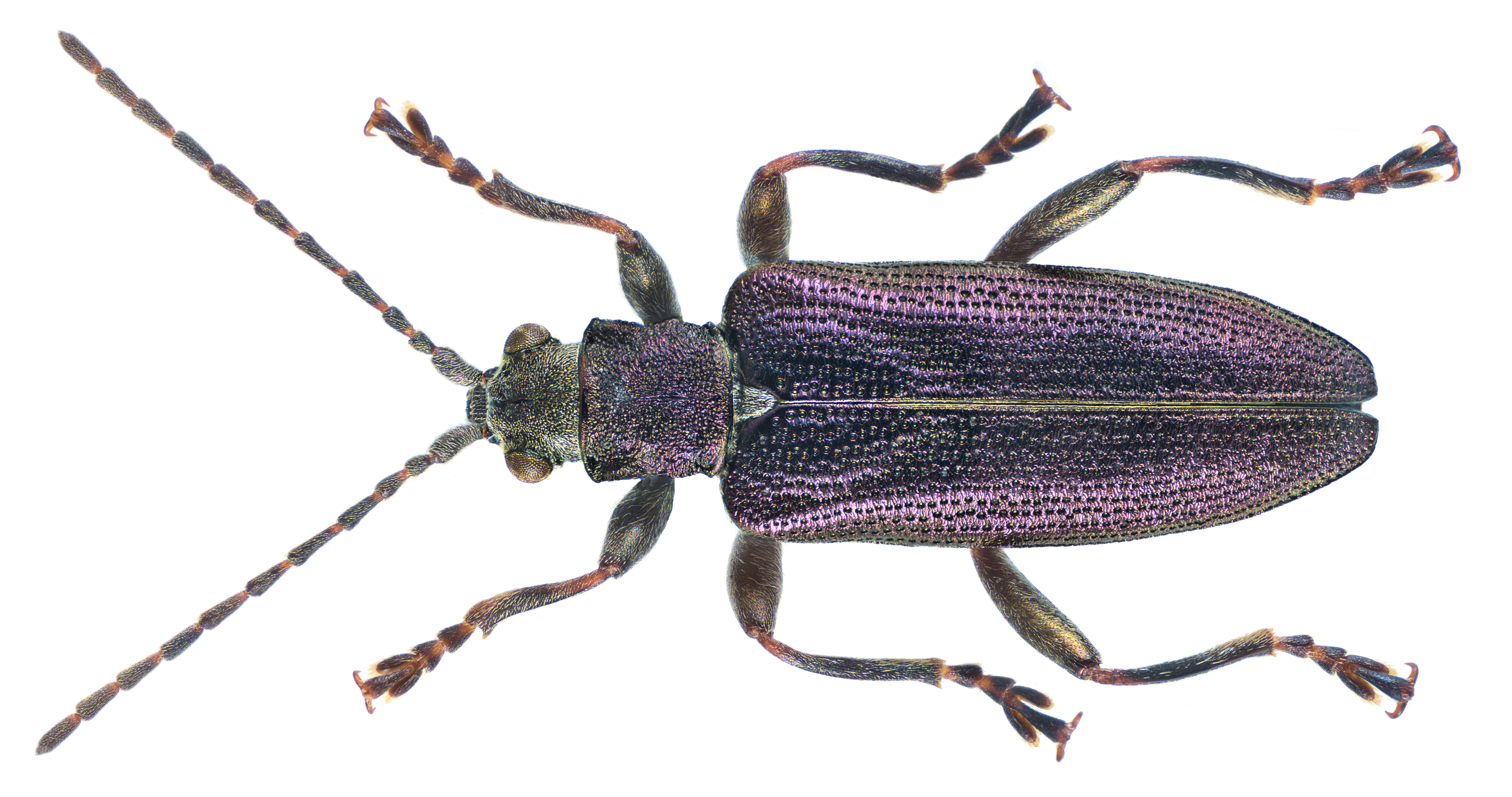

Scientific classification
- Kingdom: Animalia
- Phylum: Arthropoda
- Class: Insecta
- Order: Coleoptera
- Suborder: Polyphaga
- Infraorder: Cucujiformia
- Family: Chrysomelidae
- Genus: Donacia
- Species: D. thalassina

Binomial name
- Donacia thalassina Germar, 1811

= Donacia thalassina =

Species of beetle

Donacia thalassina is a species of leaf beetle of the subfamily Donaciinae. Distributed in the Palearctic region.
