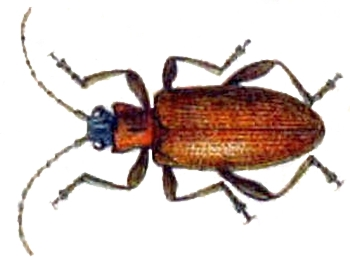

Scientific classification
- Kingdom: Animalia
- Phylum: Arthropoda
- Clade: Pancrustacea
- Class: Insecta
- Order: Coleoptera
- Suborder: Polyphaga
- Infraorder: Cucujiformia
- Family: Chrysomelidae
- Genus: Donacia
- Species: D. fennica

Binomial name
- Donacia fennica Paykull, 1800

= Donacia fennica =

Species of beetle

Donacia fennica is a species of leaf beetles of the subfamily Donaciinae. It can be found in Iberian Peninsula and Western Siberia.
