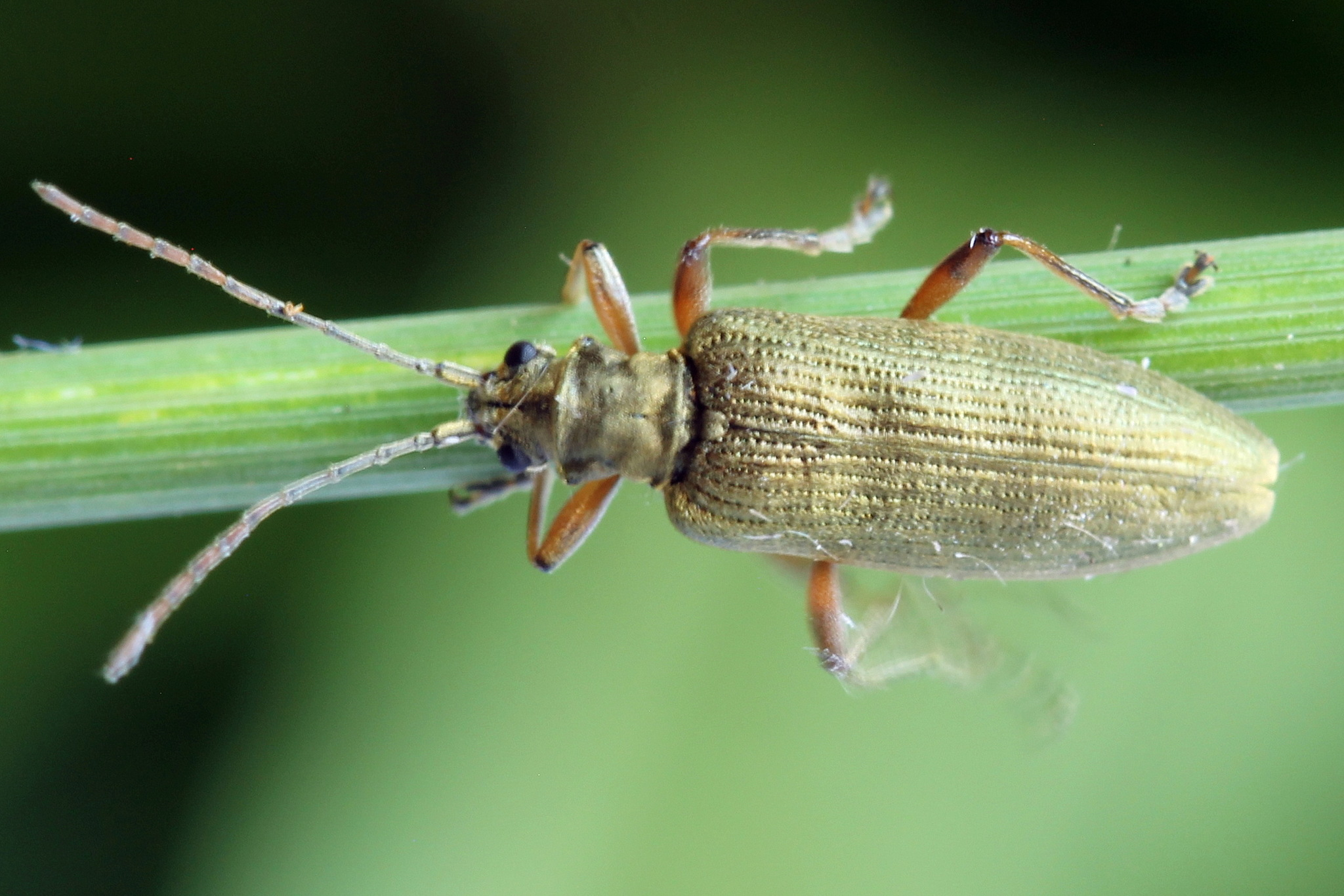

Scientific classification
- Kingdom: Animalia
- Phylum: Arthropoda
- Class: Insecta
- Order: Coleoptera
- Suborder: Polyphaga
- Infraorder: Cucujiformia
- Family: Chrysomelidae
- Genus: Donacia
- Species: D. tomentosaa

Binomial name
- Donacia tomentosaa Ahrens, 1810

= Donacia tomentosa =

Species of beetle

Donacia tomentosa is a species of leaf beetle, that is distributed throughout Palearctic region, and from Southern France to Central Siberia.

== Description ==
The males of the species have a gray coloured wings and are smaller comparing to females, while females have green.
