= Donacia malinovskyi =

Scientific classification
- Kingdom: Animalia
- Phylum: Arthropoda
- Clade: Pancrustacea
- Class: Insecta
- Order: Coleoptera
- Suborder: Polyphaga
- Infraorder: Cucujiformia
- Family: Chrysomelidae
- Genus: Donacia
- Species: D. malinovskyi

Binomial name
- Donacia malinovskyi Ahrens, 1810

Species of beetle

Donacia malinovskyi is a species of leaf beetle of the subfamily Donaciinae.

== Distribution ==
Distributed in Central Europe from France to Poland and in Eastern Europe in the Volga Basin.

== Description ==
Beetle is 7–10 millimetres (0.28–0.39 in) in length. The upper part of the body is dark green or purple, golden on the sides, at least the top of the golden-brown color. Elytron is straightly cut at the top. The median groove of prothorax is deep.

== Ecology ==
The species can be found in the forest and the steppe zones.
