= Donacia andalusiaca =

Scientific classification
- Kingdom: Animalia
- Phylum: Arthropoda
- Class: Insecta
- Order: Coleoptera
- Suborder: Polyphaga
- Infraorder: Cucujiformia
- Family: Chrysomelidae
- Genus: Donacia
- Species: D. andalusiaca

Binomial name
- Donacia andalusiaca Kraatz, 1869

Species of beetle

Donacia andalusiaca is a species of leaf beetle of the subfamily Donaciinae that is endemic to Spain.
