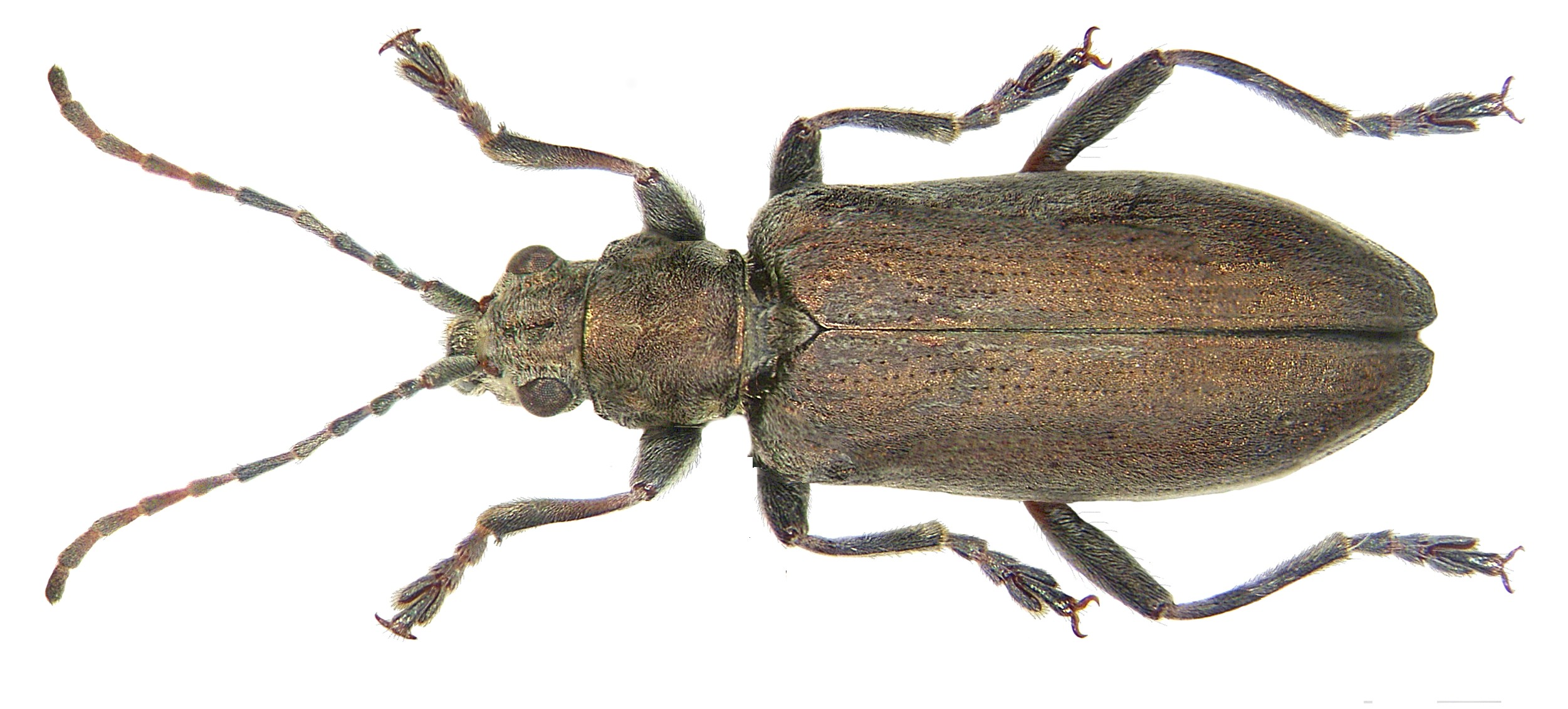

Scientific classification
- Kingdom: Animalia
- Phylum: Arthropoda
- Class: Insecta
- Order: Coleoptera
- Suborder: Polyphaga
- Infraorder: Cucujiformia
- Family: Chrysomelidae
- Genus: Donacia
- Species: D. cinerea

Binomial name
- Donacia cinerea (Herbst 1784)

= Donacia cinerea =

Species of beetle

Donacia cinerea is a species of leaf beetle in the subfamily Donaciella. It can be found in Czech Republic and Slovakia.
