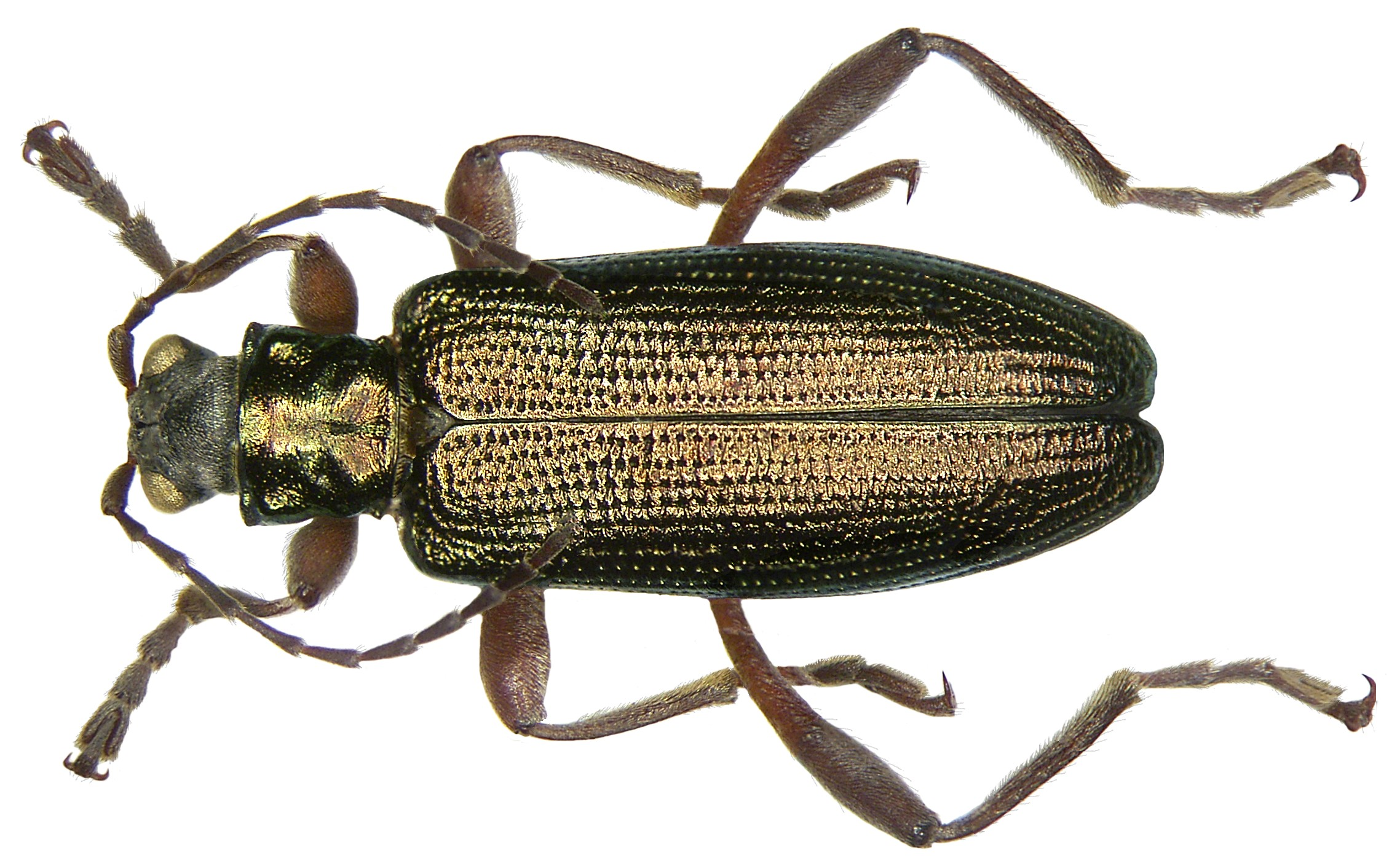

Scientific classification
- Kingdom: Animalia
- Phylum: Arthropoda
- Class: Insecta
- Order: Coleoptera
- Suborder: Polyphaga
- Infraorder: Cucujiformia
- Family: Chrysomelidae
- Genus: Donacia
- Species: D. clavipes

Binomial name
- Donacia clavipes Fabricius, 1793

= Donacia clavipes =

Species of beetle

Donacia clavipes is a species of leaf beetles from the subfamily of Donaciinae.

== Description ==
Adult beetles are 7–12 millimetres (0.28–0.47 in) in length. Elytron is rounded completely on top. Hind femur reaching apex of elytron, which have no teeth. Elytron have no indentations. Antenna and legs are reddish-colored, the top is bronze-green.

== Distribution ==
Distributed in the western part of the Palearctic region from the central part of Spain as far east as northern China, in Europe, in the southern to northern Italy and Romania, is registered and the shores of the Black Sea, as well as in Turkey.
