= Donacia aequidorsis =

Scientific classification
- Kingdom: Animalia
- Phylum: Arthropoda
- Class: Insecta
- Order: Coleoptera
- Suborder: Polyphaga
- Infraorder: Cucujiformia
- Family: Chrysomelidae
- Genus: Donacia
- Species: D. aequidorsis

Binomial name
- Donacia aequidorsis Jacobson, 1894

Species of beetle

Donacia aequidorsis is a species of leaf beetles of the subfamily of Donaciinae. Distributed in Russia (the northern coast and in the Caspian Sea).
