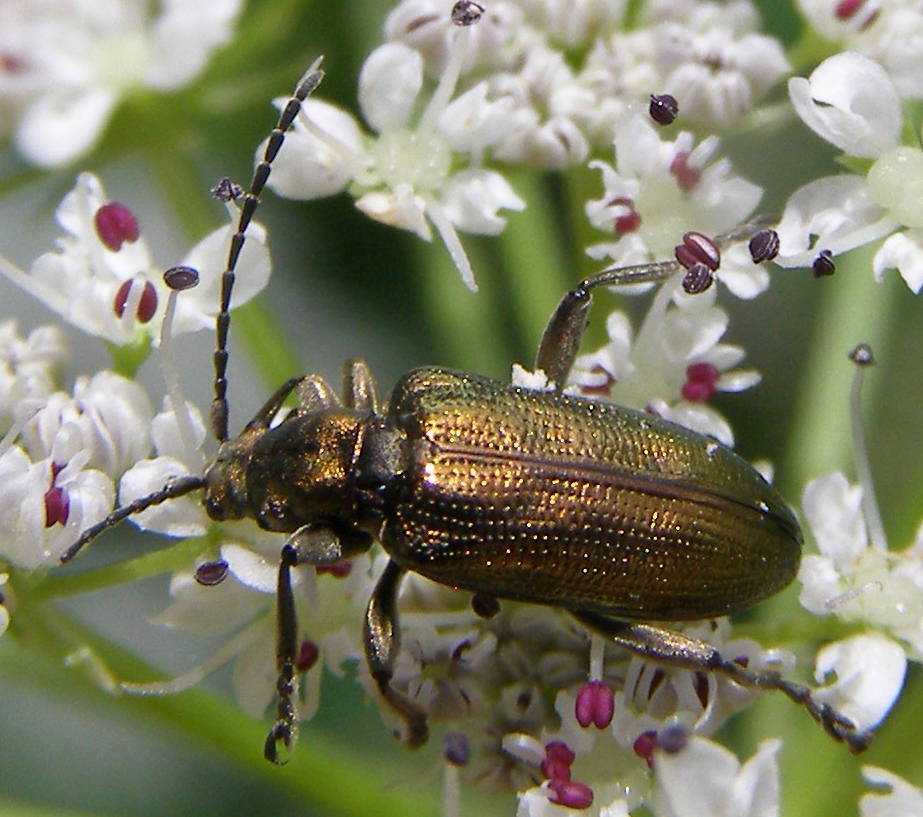

Scientific classification
- Kingdom: Animalia
- Phylum: Arthropoda
- Class: Insecta
- Order: Coleoptera
- Suborder: Polyphaga
- Infraorder: Cucujiformia
- Family: Chrysomelidae
- Genus: Donacia
- Species: D. semicuprea

Binomial name
- Donacia semicuprea Panzer, 1796

= Donacia semicuprea =

Species of beetle

Donacia semicuprea is a species of leaf beetles of the subfamily of Donaciinae.

== Distribution ==
The species can be found in the following European territories: Austria, Belarus, Bosnia and Herzegovina, Great Britain including the Isle of Man, Bulgaria, Croatia, Czech Republic, mainland Denmark, Estonia, Finland, Germany, Hungary, Ireland, mainland Italy, Kaliningrad region, Latvia, Liechtenstein, Lithuania, Luxembourg, Moldova, mainland Norway, Poland, Romania, all of Russia except the north, Slovakia, Slovenia, Sweden, the Netherlands, Ukraine, Serbia. Kosovo, and Montenegro.

== Ecology and habitats ==
Adult beetles feed on leaves of Glyceria maxima and Glyceria notata. The pupa develops among the roots of Sparganium erectum. The larvae feed on roots and leaves of the large Manik (Glyceria).
