= Donacia parvidens =

Scientific classification
- Kingdom: Animalia
- Phylum: Arthropoda
- Class: Insecta
- Order: Coleoptera
- Suborder: Polyphaga
- Infraorder: Cucujiformia
- Family: Chrysomelidae
- Genus: Donacia
- Species: D. parvidens

Binomial name
- Donacia parvidens Schaeffer, 1919

Species of beetle

Donacia parvidens is a species of aquatic leaf beetle in the family Chrysomelidae. It is found in North America.
