= Donacia brevitarsis =

Scientific classification
- Kingdom: Animalia
- Phylum: Arthropoda
- Class: Insecta
- Order: Coleoptera
- Suborder: Polyphaga
- Infraorder: Cucujiformia
- Family: Chrysomelidae
- Genus: Donacia
- Species: D. brevitarsis

Binomial name
- Donacia brevitarsis C. G. Thomson, 1884

Species of beetle

Donacia brevitarsis is a species of leaf beetle of the subfamily Donaciinae. Distributed from France to Russia, in northern Italy and Central Europe. It feeds on Carex plants, mainly Carex vesicaria.
