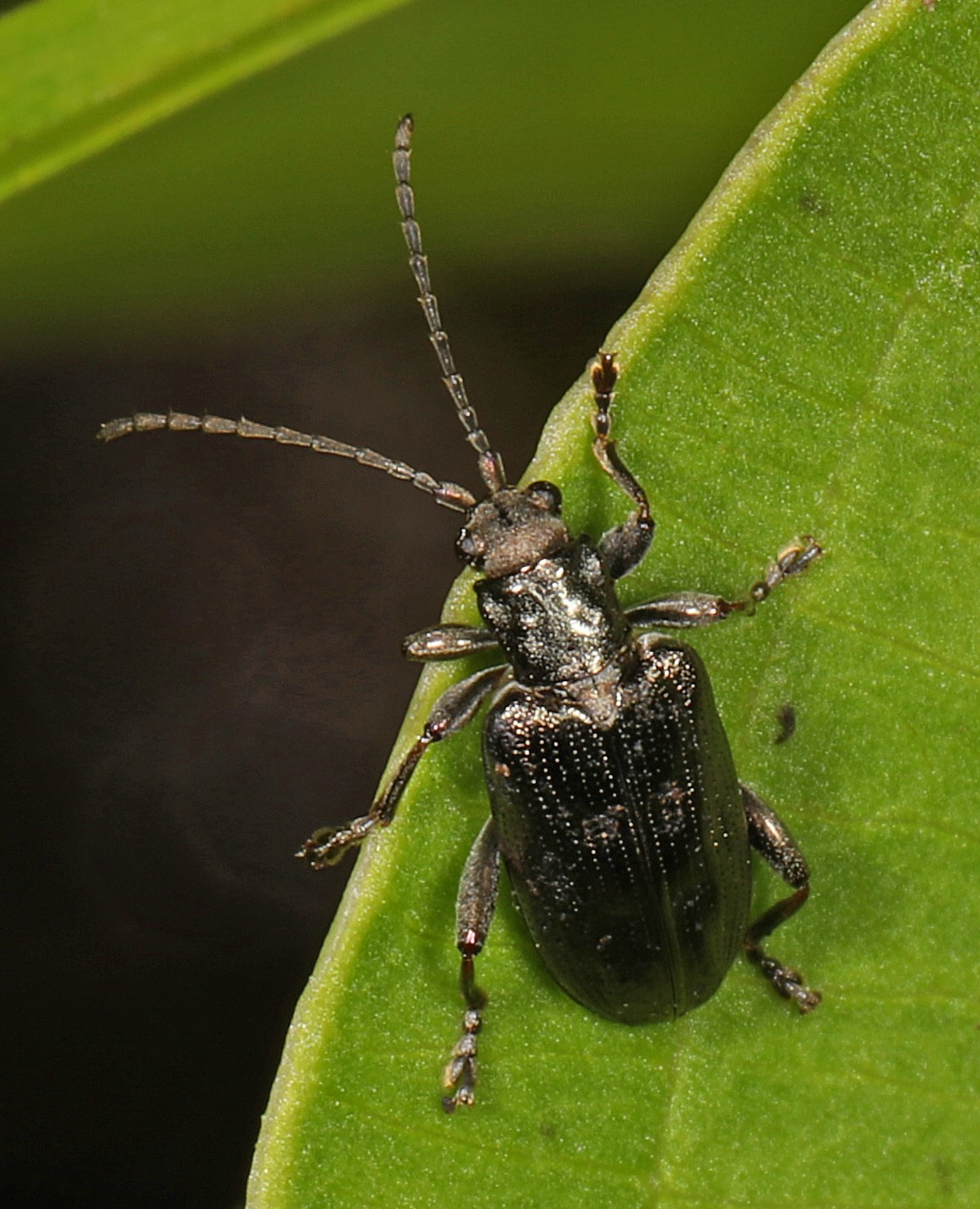

Scientific classification
- Kingdom: Animalia
- Phylum: Arthropoda
- Clade: Pancrustacea
- Class: Insecta
- Order: Coleoptera
- Suborder: Polyphaga
- Infraorder: Cucujiformia
- Family: Chrysomelidae
- Genus: Donacia
- Species: D. caerulea

Binomial name
- Donacia caerulea Olivier, 1795

Synonyms
- Donacia aequalis Say, 1824

= Donacia caerulea =

Species of beetle

Donacia caerulea is a species of aquatic leaf beetle in the family Chrysomelidae. It is found in North America.
