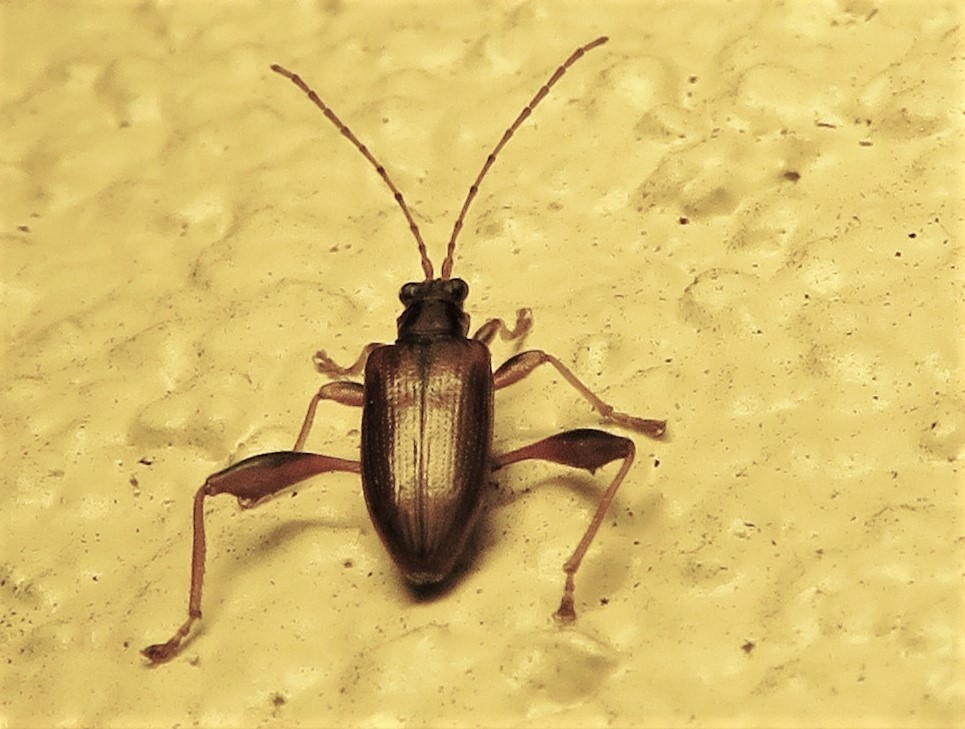

Scientific classification
- Kingdom: Animalia
- Phylum: Arthropoda
- Class: Insecta
- Order: Coleoptera
- Suborder: Polyphaga
- Infraorder: Cucujiformia
- Family: Chrysomelidae
- Genus: Donacia
- Species: D. texana

Binomial name
- Donacia texana Crotch, 1873

= Donacia texana =

Species of beetle

Donacia texana is a species of aquatic leaf beetle in the family Chrysomelidae. It is found across most of eastern North America, from Ontario south to Florida and Texas.
