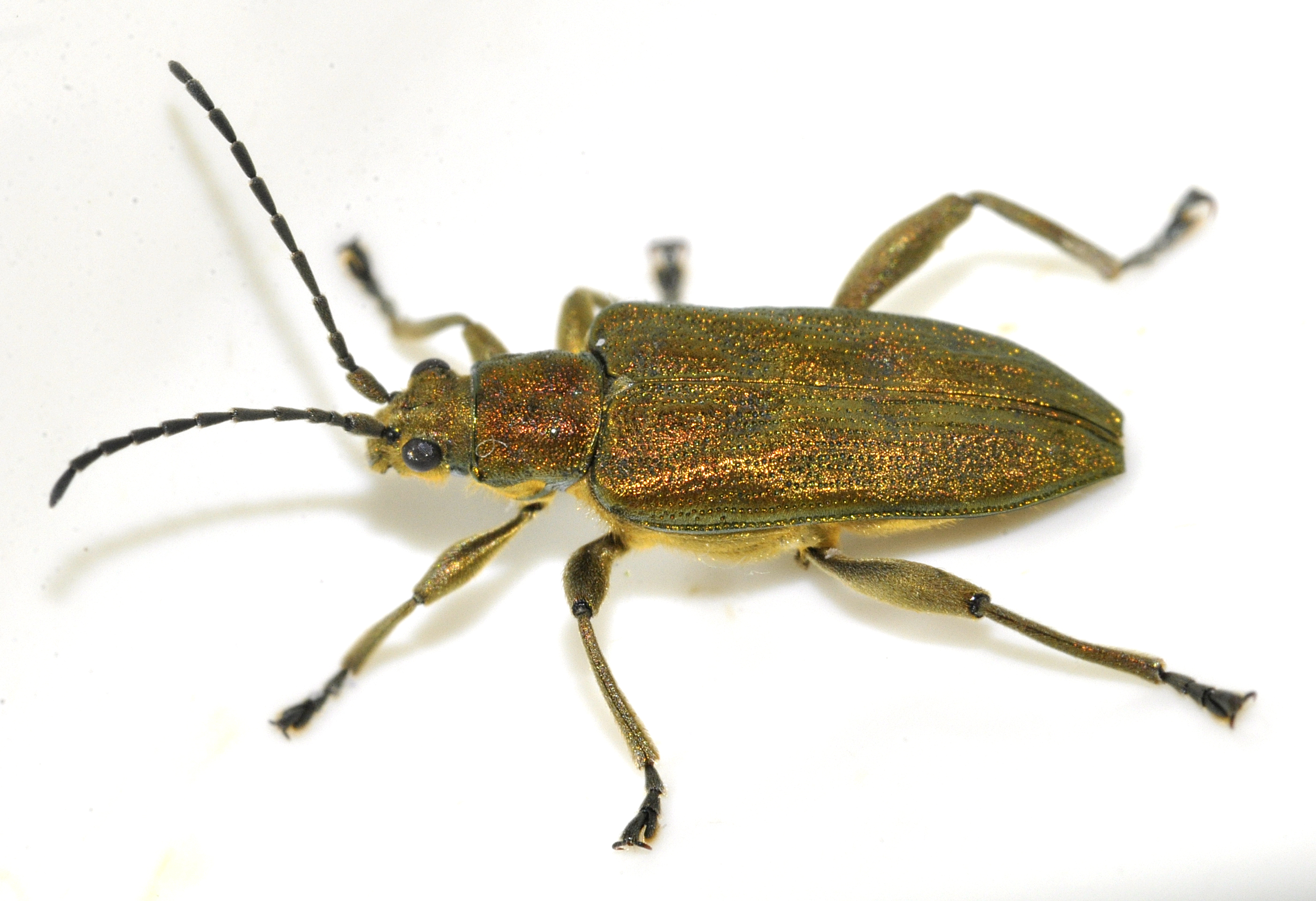
- Donacia bicolora

Scientific classification
- Kingdom: Animalia
- Phylum: Arthropoda
- Class: Insecta
- Order: Coleoptera
- Suborder: Polyphaga
- Infraorder: Cucujiformia
- Family: Chrysomelidae
- Genus: Donacia
- Subgenus: Donacocia; Gistel, 1856

= Donacocia =

Subgenus of beetles

Donacocia is the largest subgenus of the aquatic leaf beetle genus Donacia. About 21 species are found in North America and a further 75 species in the Palaearctic Region, ranging from Europe to Asia. Species of the subgenus Donacocia are aquatic, living in larval stages attached to aquatic plant roots. Adults are found on the stems and flower heads of these plants. Typically they are found on sedges and species of the genera Sparganium and Sagittaria.
