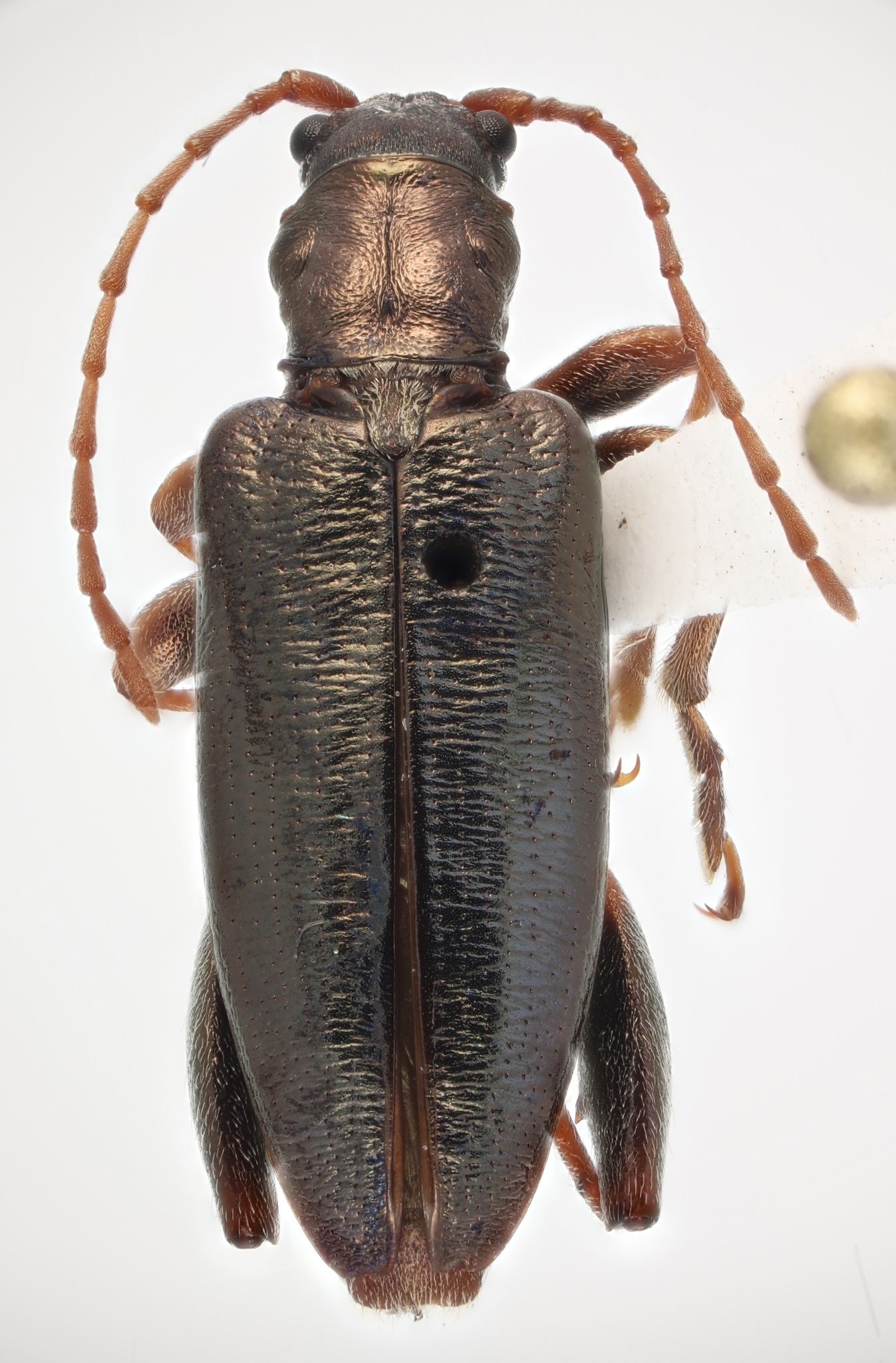

Scientific classification
- Kingdom: Animalia
- Phylum: Arthropoda
- Class: Insecta
- Order: Coleoptera
- Suborder: Polyphaga
- Infraorder: Cucujiformia
- Family: Chrysomelidae
- Subfamily: Donaciinae
- Tribe: Plateumarini
- Genus: Poecilocera; Schaeffer, 1919
- Species: P. harrisii

Binomial name
- Poecilocera harrisii (J.L.LeConte, 1851)

= Poecilocera =

Poecilocera harrisii

Genus of beetles

Poecilocera is a genus of aquatic leaf beetles in the family Chrysomelidae. It is monotypic, being represented by the single species Poecilocera harrisii.
