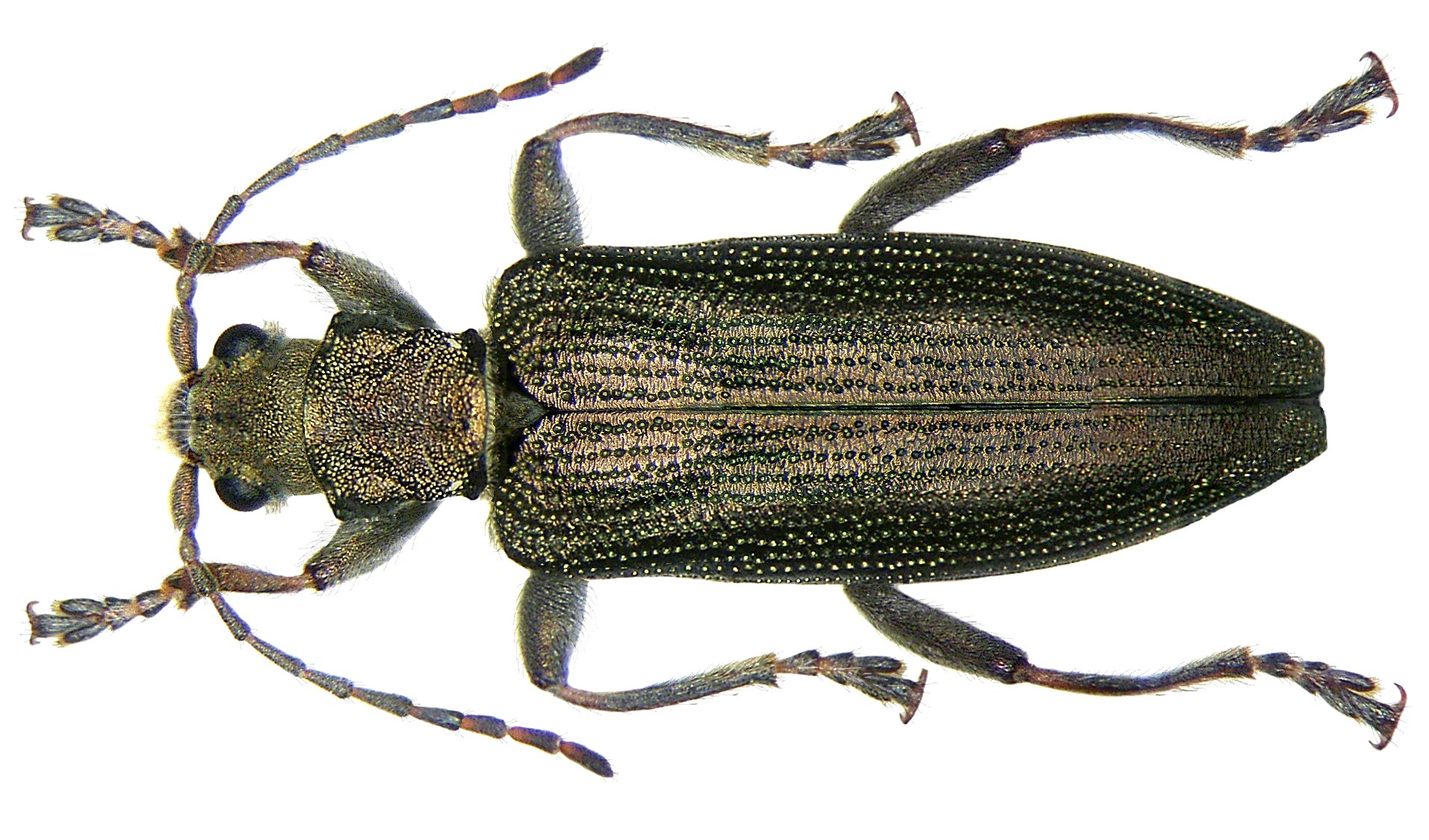

Scientific classification
- Kingdom: Animalia
- Phylum: Arthropoda
- Class: Insecta
- Order: Coleoptera
- Suborder: Polyphaga
- Infraorder: Cucujiformia
- Family: Chrysomelidae
- Genus: Donacia
- Species: D. simplex

Binomial name
- Donacia simplex Fabricius, 1775

= Donacia simplex =

Species of beetle

Donacia simplex is a species of leaf beetle native to Europe.
