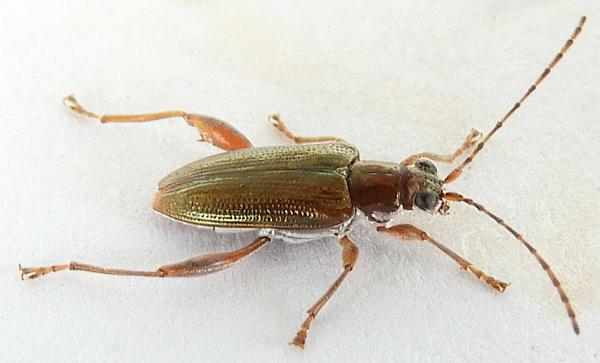

Scientific classification
- Kingdom: Animalia
- Phylum: Arthropoda
- Class: Insecta
- Order: Coleoptera
- Suborder: Polyphaga
- Infraorder: Cucujiformia
- Family: Chrysomelidae
- Genus: Donacia
- Species: D. cincticornis

Binomial name
- Donacia cincticornis Newman, 1838

= Donacia cincticornis =

Species of beetle

Donacia cincticornis is a species of aquatic leaf beetle in the family Chrysomelidae. It is found in the Caribbean Sea, Central America, and North America.

== Subspecies ==
These three subspecies belong to the species Donacia cincticornis:

- Donacia cincticornis cincticornis
- Donacia cincticornis tenuis Schaeffer
- Donacia cincticornis tryphera Schaeffer
