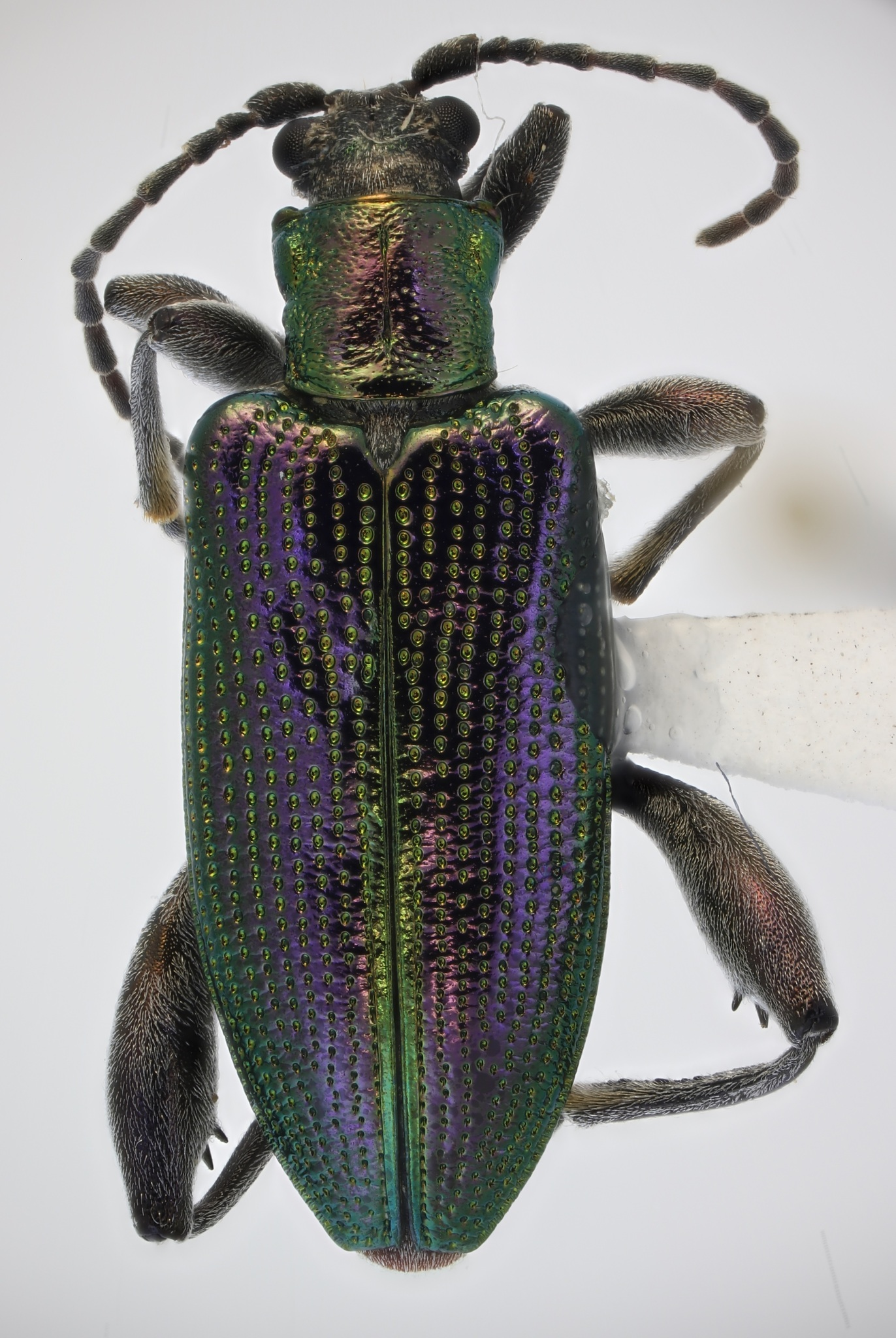

Conservation status
- Secure (NatureServe)

Scientific classification
- Kingdom: Animalia
- Phylum: Arthropoda
- Class: Insecta
- Order: Coleoptera
- Suborder: Polyphaga
- Infraorder: Cucujiformia
- Family: Chrysomelidae
- Genus: Donacia
- Species: D. magnifica

Binomial name
- Donacia magnifica J. L. LeConte, 1851

= Donacia magnifica =

Species of beetle

Donacia magnifica is a species of aquatic leaf beetle in the family Chrysomelidae. It is found in North America in Canada and northern United States. It is associated with the leaves of its hostplant, Potamogeton spp. It is also known as the magnificent aquatic leaf beetle.
