= Donacia microcephala =

Scientific classification
- Kingdom: Animalia
- Phylum: Arthropoda
- Clade: Pancrustacea
- Class: Insecta
- Order: Coleoptera
- Suborder: Polyphaga
- Infraorder: Cucujiformia
- Family: Chrysomelidae
- Genus: Donacia
- Species: D. microcephala

Binomial name
- Donacia microcephala Daniel et Daniel, 1904

Species of beetle

Donacia microcephala is a species of leaf beetle that is distributed throughout Iran, Iraq, and Turkey.

== Description ==
The species have a gray coloured wings, with orange legs and antennae. Their head is black.
