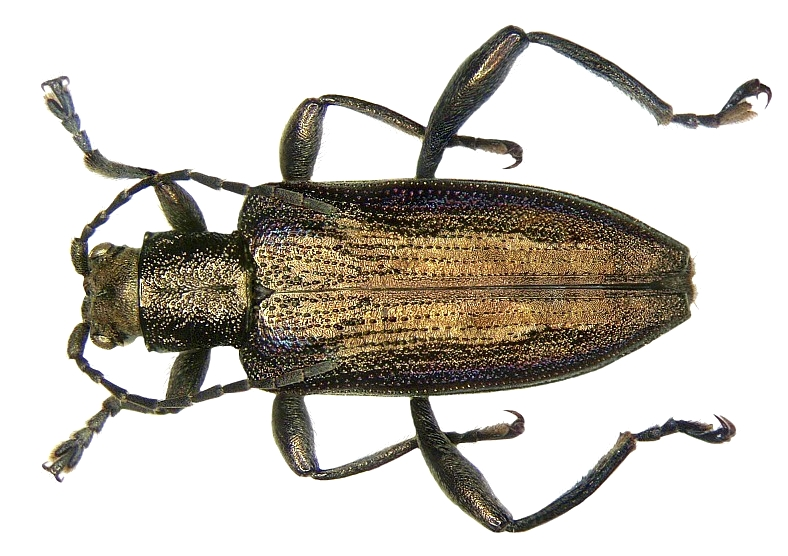

Scientific classification
- Kingdom: Animalia
- Phylum: Arthropoda
- Class: Insecta
- Order: Coleoptera
- Suborder: Polyphaga
- Infraorder: Cucujiformia
- Family: Chrysomelidae
- Genus: Donacia
- Species: D. marginata

Binomial name
- Donacia marginata Hoppe, 1795

= Donacia marginata =

Species of beetle

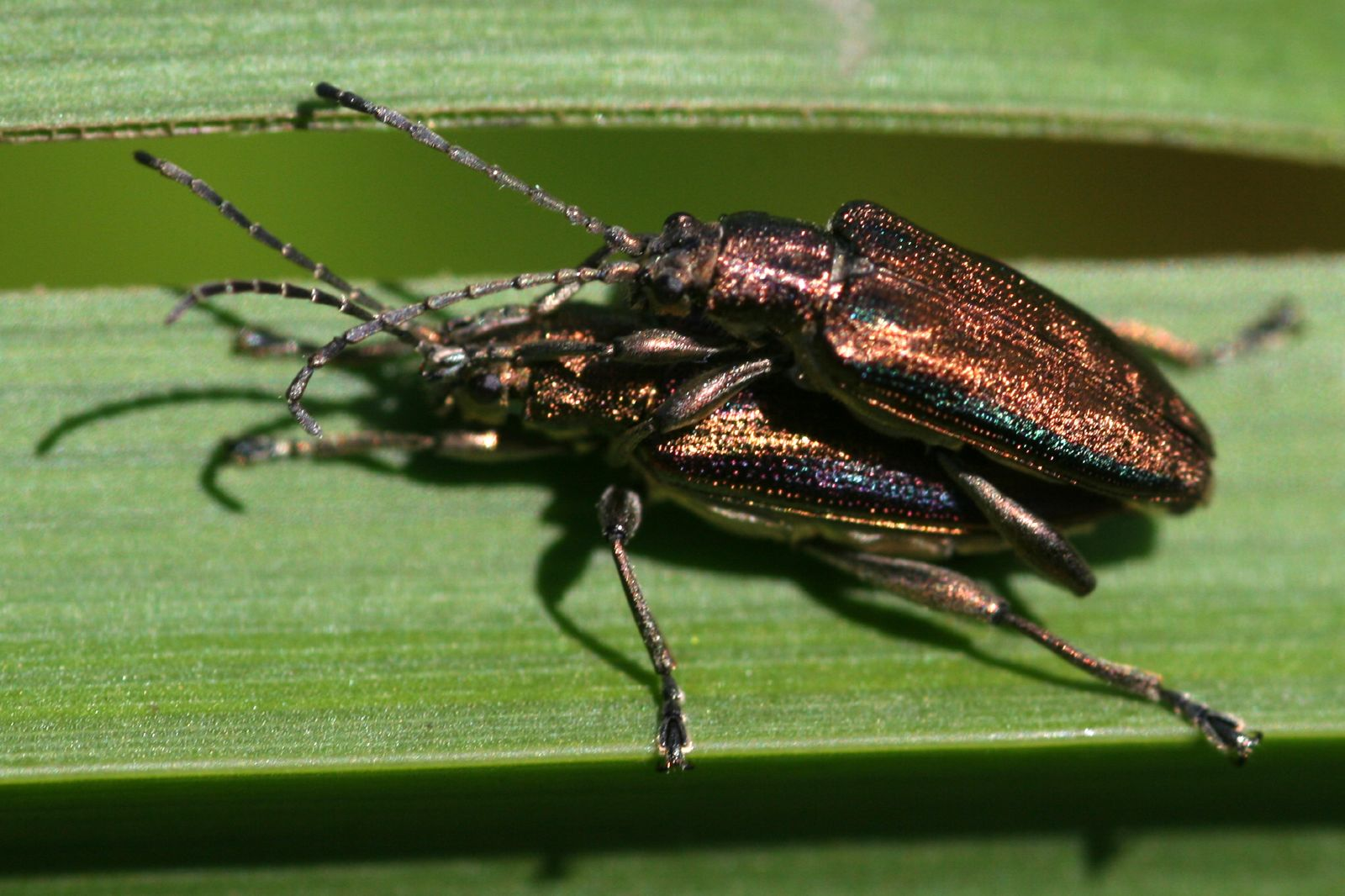
Donacia marginata in cop

Donacia marginata is a species of leaf beetle native to Europe.
