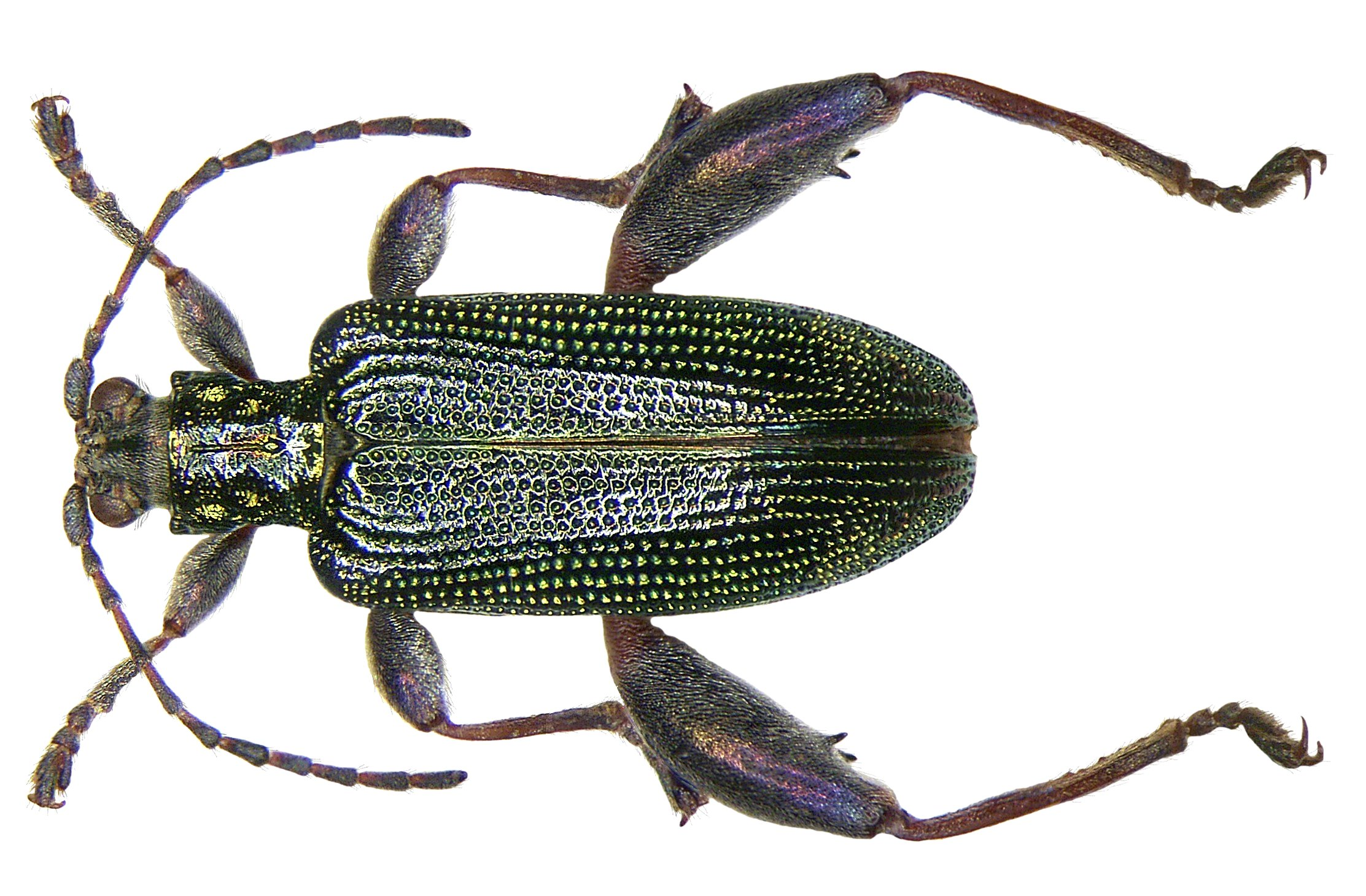

Scientific classification
- Kingdom: Animalia
- Phylum: Arthropoda
- Clade: Pancrustacea
- Class: Insecta
- Order: Coleoptera
- Suborder: Polyphaga
- Infraorder: Cucujiformia
- Family: Chrysomelidae
- Genus: Donacia
- Species: D. versicolorea

Binomial name
- Donacia versicolorea (Brahm, 1790)

= Donacia versicolorea =

Species of beetle

Donacia versicolorea is a species of leaf beetle native to Europe.
