= Donaciella =

Scientific classification
- Kingdom: Animalia
- Phylum: Arthropoda
- Class: Insecta
- Order: Coleoptera
- Suborder: Polyphaga
- Infraorder: Cucujiformia
- Family: Chrysomelidae
- Subfamily: Donaciinae
- Genus: Donaciella; Reitter, 1920

Genus of beetles

Donaciella is a genus of leaf beetles from the subfamily of Donaciinae.
