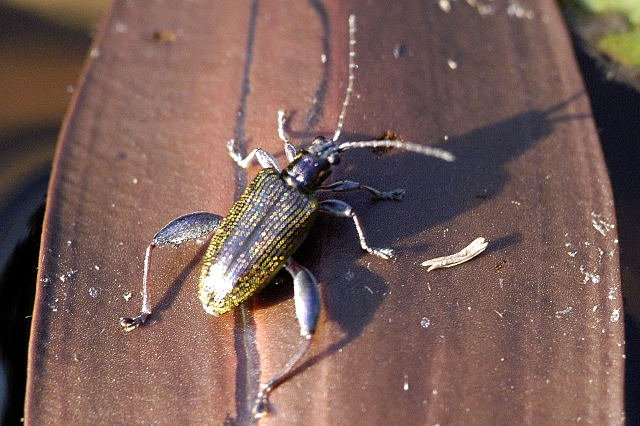
- Donacia versicolorea
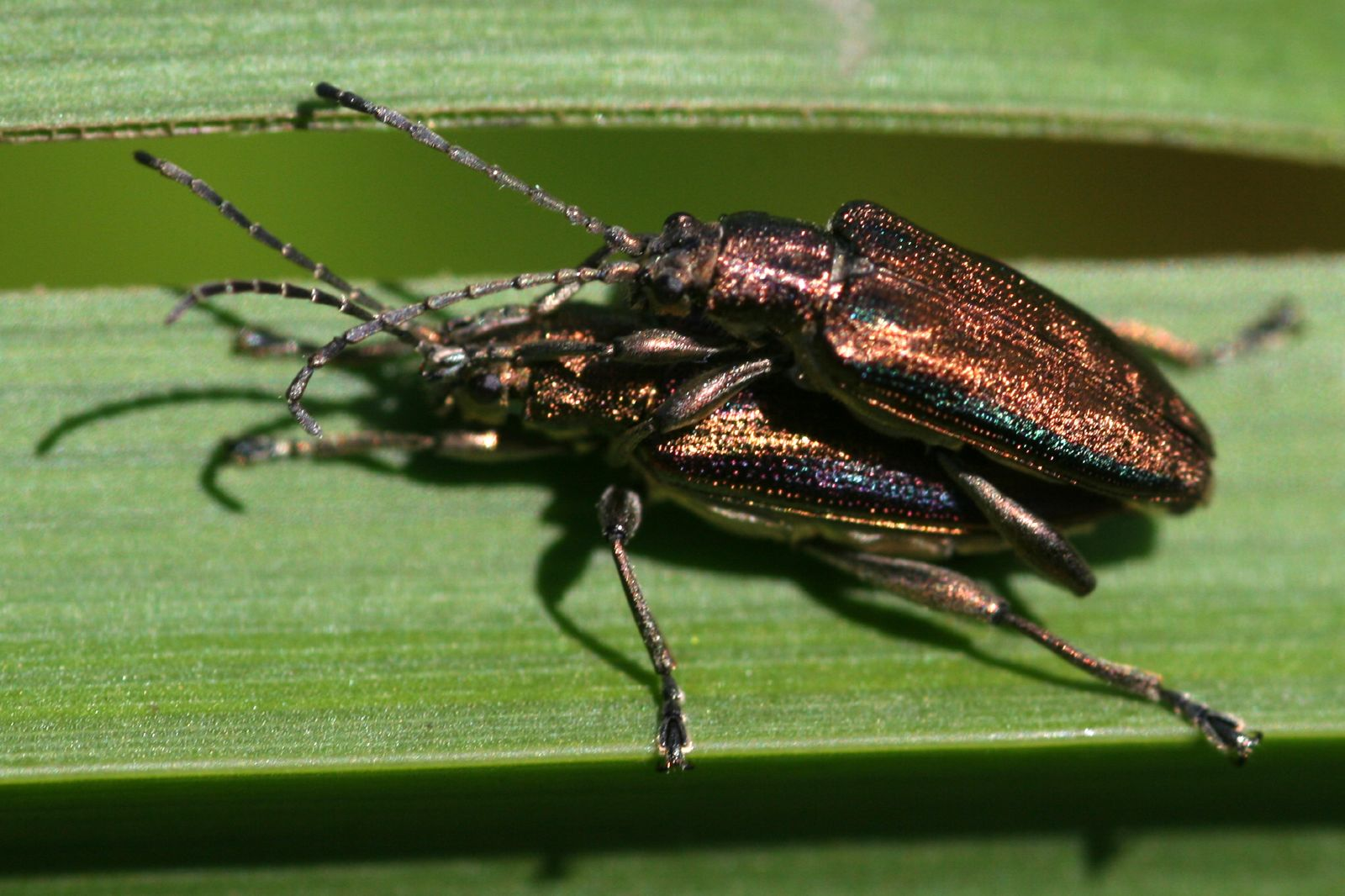
- Donacia marginata mating pair

Scientific classification
- Kingdom: Animalia
- Phylum: Arthropoda
- Class: Insecta
- Order: Coleoptera
- Suborder: Polyphaga
- Infraorder: Cucujiformia
- Family: Chrysomelidae
- Subfamily: Donaciinae
- Tribe: Donaciini
- Genus: Donacia; Fabricius, 1775

= Donacia =

Genus of beetles

Donacia is a large genus of aquatic leaf beetles in the subfamily Donaciinae. Like other members of that subfamily, the beetles have densely pubescent undersides and long antennae. The genus is recognized by the truncate elytral apex and pubescent area above the procoxa. Adults are active and readily take flight. Adults feed on the upper epidermis of host plants; some may be pollen feeders. Larvae feed on the sap of submerged portions of aquatic plants, such as water lilies, sedges (Cyperaceae), Sagittaria (Alismataceae), Sparganium (Typhaceae), pond weed (Potamogeton). They are believed to breathe oxygen from plant vessels as well as cutaneously. Adults live on surface parts of the same plants but can go under water for extended periods because of their plastron.

There are 15 proposed subgenera. The three largest subgenera are: Donacia (Donacia) s. str., with 10 Nearctic and 5 Palaearctic species; Donacia (Cyphogaster) with about 6 Australasian species; and Donacia (Donacocia) containing about 21 Nearctic species and about 75 Palaearctic species.

== Species ==
These 113 species belong to the genus Donacia:

- Donacia aequidorsis Jacobson, 1894
- Donacia aeraria Baly, 1867
- Donacia andalusiaca Kraatz, 1869
- Donacia anetae Bienkowski, 2015
- Donacia antiqua Kunze, 1818 (Europe)
- Donacia aquatica (Linnaeus, 1758) (Zircon Reed Beetle) (Europe)
- Donacia assimilis Lacordaire, 1845 (North America)
- Donacia aureocincta J.Sahlberg, 1921 (Europe)
- Donacia bicolora Zschach, 1788 (Reed Beetle) (Europe)
- Donacia bicoloricornis Chen (temperate Asia)
- Donacia biimpressa Melsheimer, 1847 (North America)
- Donacia brevicornis Ahrens, 1810 (Europe)
- Donacia brevitarsis Thomson, 1884 (Europe)
- Donacia caerulea Olivier, 1795 (North America)
- Donacia cazieri Marx, 1957 (North America)
- Donacia cincticornis Newman, 1838 (the Caribbean Sea, Central America, and North America)
- Donacia cinerea Herbst, 1784 (Europe)
- Donacia clavareaui Jacobson, 1906
- Donacia clavipes Fabricius, 1792 (Europe)
- Donacia confluenta Say, 1826 (North America)
- Donacia connelli Cockerell, 1927
- Donacia cordovae Pierce, 1950
- Donacia crassipes Fabricius, 1775 (Water-Lily Reed Beetle) (Europe)
- Donacia cuprea Kirby, 1837 (North America)
- Donacia delesserti (Guérin-Méneville, 1839)
- Donacia dentata Hoppe, 1795 (Europe)
- Donacia disjecta Förster, 1891
- Donacia dissimilis Schaeffer, 1925 (North America)
- Donacia distincta LeConte, 1851 (North America)
- Donacia draycoti Pierce, 1950
- Donacia edentata Schaeffer, 1919 (North America)
- Donacia elongatula Scudder, 1898
- Donacia fastuosa Khnzorian, 1962
- Donacia fennica (Paykull, 1800) (Europe)
- Donacia flemora Goecke, 1944
- Donacia frontalis Jacoby, 1893 (temperate Asia)
- Donacia fukiensis Goecke, 1944
- Donacia fulgens LeConte, 1851 (North America)
- Donacia galaica Baguena, 1959
- Donacia geiseltali Goecke, 1959
- Donacia haupti Goecke, 1959
- Donacia hirticollis Kirby, 1837 (North America)
- Donacia hiurai Kimoto, 1983
- Donacia hypoleuca Lacordaire, 1845 (North America)
- Donacia impressa Paykull, 1799 (Europe)
- Donacia jacobsoni Semenov & Reichardt, 1927
- Donacia japana (Chujo & Goecke, 1956)
- Donacia jaroslavii Lomnicki, 1894
- Donacia javana Wiedemann, 1821
- Donacia koenigi Jacobson, 1927
- Donacia kweilina Chen, 1966
- Donacia lenzi Schonfeldt (temperate Asia)
- Donacia letzneri Assmann, 1870
- Donacia liebecki C.Schaeffer, 1919 (North America)
- Donacia lignitum Sordelli, 1882
- Donacia limonia C.Schaeffer, 1925 (North America)
- Donacia lungtanensis Hayashi & Lee, 2009 (temperate Asia)
- Donacia lusow Hayashi & Lee, 2007 (temperate Asia)
- Donacia lynni Pierce, 1950
- Donacia magnifica LeConte, 1851 (North America)
- Donacia malinovskyi Ahrens, 1810 (Europe)
- Donacia marginata Hoppe, 1795 (Europe)
- Donacia mediohirsuta Chen, 1966
- Donacia megacornis Blatchley, 1910 (North America)
- Donacia microcephala (Daniel & Daniel, 1904) (uncertain placement)
- Donacia militaris Lacordaire, 1845 (North America)
- Donacia minuta Haupt, 1956
- Donacia mistshenkoi Jacobson, 1910
- Donacia nitidior
- Donacia obscura Gyllenhal, 1813 (Europe)
- Donacia obtusa Haupt, 1956
- Donacia ochroleuca Weise, 1912
- Donacia ozensis (Nakane, 1954)
- Donacia palaemonis Heer, 1847
- Donacia palmata Olivier, 1795 (North America)
- Donacia parvidens C.Schaeffer, 1919 (North America)
- Donacia piscatrix Lacordaire, 1845 (North America)
- Donacia pitoni Goecke, 1959
- Donacia polita Kunze, 1818 (Europe)
- Donacia pompatica Scudder, 1890
- Donacia porosicollis Lacordaire, 1845 (North America)
- Donacia provostii Fairmaire (temperate Asia)
- Donacia proxima Kirby, 1837 (North America)
- Donacia pterobrachys Haupt, 1956
- Donacia pubescens LeConte, 1868 (North America)
- Donacia reticulata Gyllenhal, 1817
- Donacia rottensis Goecke, 1960
- Donacia rufescens Lacordaire, 1845 (North America)
- Donacia rugosa LeConte, 1878 (North America)
- Donacia semicuprea Panzer, 1796 (Europe)
- Donacia simplex Fabricius, 1775 (Europe)
- Donacia sparganii Ahrens, 1810 (Europe)
- Donacia splendida Théobald, 1935
- Donacia springeri Müller, 1916 (Europe)
- Donacia statzi Goecke, 1943
- Donacia stiria Scudder, 1890
- Donacia stirioides Wickham, 1917
- Donacia subtilis Kunze, 1818 (North America)
- Donacia tenuipunctata Théobald, 1935
- Donacia texana Crotch, 1873 (North America)
- Donacia thalassina Germar, 1811 (Europe)
- Donacia tomentosa Ahrens, 1810 (Europe)
- Donacia tuberculata Lacordaire, 1845 (North America)
- Donacia tuberculifrons C.Schaeffer, 1919 (North America)
- Donacia uedana Hayashi, 2000
- Donacia versicolorea (Brahm, 1790) (Europe)
- Donacia vicina Lacordaire, 1845 (North America)
- Donacia vietnamensis Kimoto & Gressitt, 1979
- Donacia voigti Goecke, 1943
- Donacia vulgaris Zschach, 1788 (Europe)
- Donacia weigelti Goecke, 1943
- Donacia weylandi Goecke, 1960
- Donacia wightoni (Askevold, 1990)
- Donacia zosterae Fabricius, 1801
