= Johann Jacob Zschach =

German naturalist and entomologist (1737-1809)

Johann Jacob Zschach (1737 Leipzig - 1809) was a German naturalist and entomologist. He was a professor in Leipzig and Marburg and the curator of the Museum Leskeanum.

== Works ==
- Zschach, J. J. 1788: Museum N. G. Leskeanum. Pars Entomologica ad systema entomologiae Cl. Fabricii ordinata cura I. I. Zschachii, M. Bacc. - Lipsiae, I. G. Müller [2]+136 p., 3 col. Taf.

A systematic list of the specimens contained in the Leske Museum in which new Coleoptera and Lepidoptera were described by Zschach. New species of Diptera were numbered, but not given names. Johann Friedrich Gmelin's 13th edition of Linnaeus' Systema Naturae (1788-1793) gave these new species Latin binomial names and the other new species were described again.
