= August Ahrens =

German entomologist

- Born: 1779; Walbeck, Saxony-Anhalt, Germany
- Died: 28 November 1841 (aged 61–62); Hettstedt, Saxony-Anhalt, Germany
- Scientific career
- Fields: Entomology

August Ahrens (1779, Walbeck – 28 November 1841, Hettstedt) was a German entomologist who specialised in Coleoptera.

== Works ==
Partial list

- Ahrens, A. 1811: Beschreibung der großen Wasserkaeferarten der Gegend um Halle in Sachsen. Neue Schriften der naturforschenden Gesellschaft zu Halle, Halle – 1 (1809–1811) (6) 47-5
- Ahrens, A. 1812. Beiträge zur Kenntniss deutscher Käfer. Neueste Schriften der Naturforschenden Gesellschaft zu Halle 2: 1–40
- Ahrens, A. 1812–1814: Fauna Insectorum Europae. Halae, C. A. Kümmel (Fasc. 1–2) je [1]+[25] p., je 25 col. Taf.
- Ahrens, A. 1829: Kritische Revision der Norddeutschen Käferfauna.[Carabici] [Mitgeteilt von Thon]. – Entomologisches Archiv(Herausgeber T. Thon), Jena – 2 (1) 8–11
- Ahrens, A. 1830: Beschreibung einiger deutschen Arten der Gattung Clivina. Entomologisches Archiv (Herausgeber T. Thon), Jena – 2 (2) 57–61
- Ahrens, A. 1833: Uebersicht aller bis jetzt auf salzhaltigem Erdboden und in dessen Gewässern entdeckten Käfer.Isis oder Encyclopaedische Zeitung von Oken, Leipzig – [26] (VII) 642–648
- Ahrens, A., Germar, E. F., Kaulfuß, F. 1812–1847: Fauna Insectorum Europae. -Halle, Kümmel (Fasc. 1–24) je [1]+[25] p., je 25 col. Taf.
