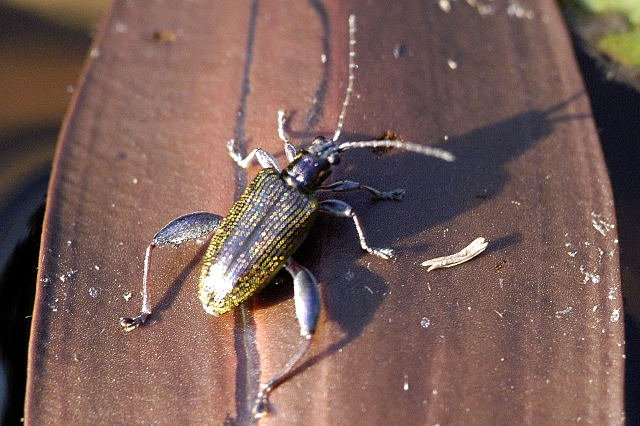
- Donacia versicolorea

Scientific classification
- Kingdom: Animalia
- Phylum: Arthropoda
- Class: Insecta
- Order: Coleoptera
- Suborder: Polyphaga
- Infraorder: Cucujiformia
- Family: Chrysomelidae
- Subfamily: Donaciinae; Kirby, 1837

= Donaciinae =

Subfamily of beetles

The Donaciinae are a subfamily of the leaf beetles, or Chrysomelidae, characterised by densely pubescent underside, generally club-shaped hind femora with one or two ventral teeth, and distinctly long antennae. They are found in mainly the Northern Hemisphere, with some species found in the Africa and Australasia.

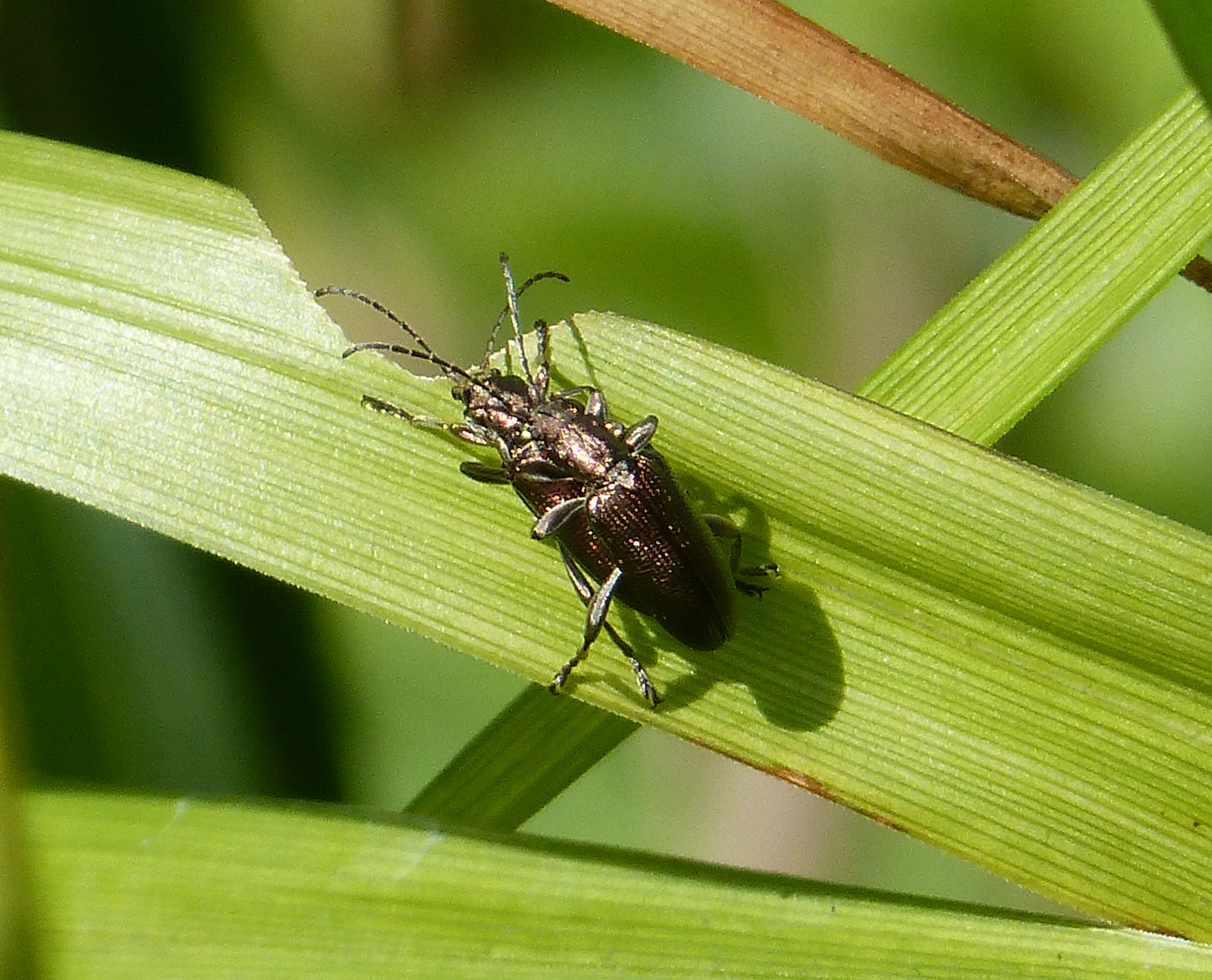
Plateumaris

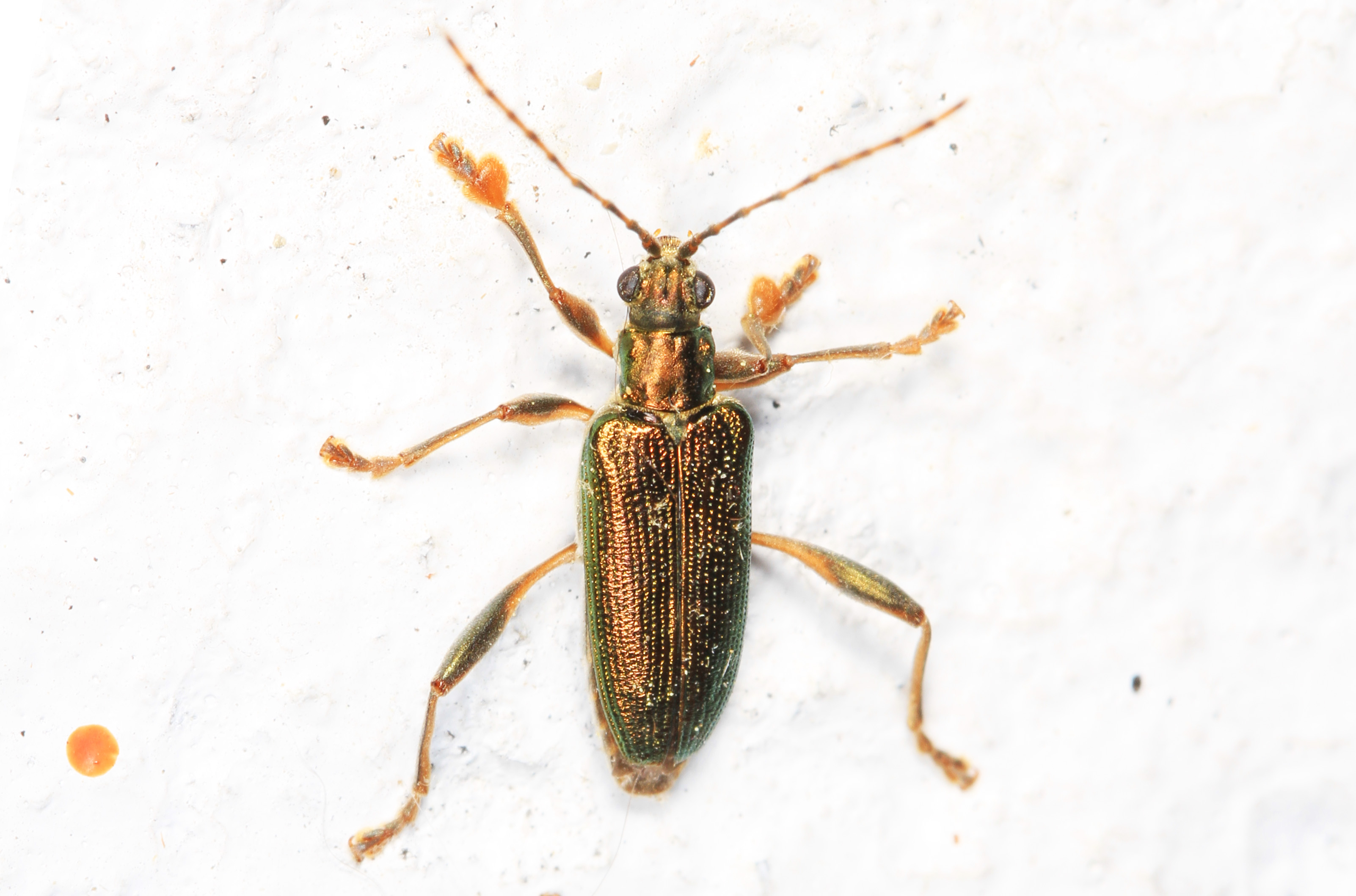
Donacia palmata

== Life cycle ==
Female Donaciinae lay eggs between aquatic plant stems and leaf sheaths, or on the underside of floating leaves. When larvae hatch they are aquatic, and attach themselves to underwater stems and roots of their plant hosts. Host plants of most species consist of diverse plants along the margin of water bodies such as slow moving streams, ponds, and lakes. A few species are found on floating-leaved plants such as Potamogeton, while species of Donacia s.str. are found on the floating leaves of water lilies and Brasenia. Adults live in vegetation bordering ponds, marshes, lakes, and brackish water environments. While most Donaciinae have the ability to fly, the fully aquatic and flightless Macroplea mutica can disperse long distances using water birds; its eggs can survive passage though the gut of a bird.

== Genera ==
These six genera belong to the subfamily Donaciinae:

- Donacia Fabricius, 1775^{i c g b}
- Donaciella Reitter, 1920^{i c g}
- Macroplea Samouelle, 1819^{i c g}
- Neohaemonia Székessy, 1941^{i c g b}
- Plateumaris Thomson, 1859^{i c g b}
- Poecilocera Schaeffer, 1919^{i c g b}

Data sources: i = ITIS, c = Catalogue of Life, g = GBIF, b = Bugguide.net
