= Psylliodes luridipennis =

Conservation status
- Critically Endangered (IUCN 3.1)

Scientific classification
- Kingdom: Animalia
- Phylum: Arthropoda
- Clade: Pancrustacea
- Class: Insecta
- Order: Coleoptera
- Suborder: Polyphaga
- Infraorder: Cucujiformia
- Family: Chrysomelidae
- Genus: Psylliodes
- Species: P. luridipennis

Binomial name
- Psylliodes luridipennis Kutschera, 1864

Species of beetle

Psylliodes luridipennis, commonly known as the Lundy cabbage flea beetle or the bronze Lundy cabbage flea beetle, is a species of flea beetle endemic to the island of Lundy, where it lives and feeds upon the endemic Lundy cabbage (Coincya wrightii). Along with the true weevil Ceutorhynchus contractus var. pallipes and an undescribed race of flea beetle Psylliodes napi both endemic species to Lundy, it is known only from the Lundy cabbage. The species was first recorded by Thomas Vernon Wollaston in the 1840s, and was named by the Austrian entomologist Franz Kutschera in 1864.

Adult Lundy cabbage flea beetle measure around 3 millimetres (0.12 in) in length. They have brassy-green heads and bodies, with reddish-brown elytra. The adults feed upon the leaves of the Lundy cabbage, while the larvae mine into the plants to feed. The species is threatened by fluctuating numbers of Lundy cabbages, particularly due to invasive common rhododendrons (Rhododendron ponticum).

== Taxonomy and evolution ==
The species was first collected by Thomas Vernon Wollaston, who visited Lundy in 1844 and 1845. He collected specimens of 153 species of beetle, including a specimen of the species that later became known as P. luridipennis. Charles Owen Waterhouse listed the species in volume 2 of the Entomologist's Monthly Magazine as "Psylliodes 6 sp. —?", and it was formally described and named by Austrian entomologist Franz Kutschera in the journal Wiener Entomologische Monatschrift in 1864.

The ancestors of the modern P. luridipennis population would have been unable to survive on Lundy during the ice age. As such, the species must either be a relict species (a species once more widespread), a species which is not unique to Lundy with other undiscovered populations, or the result of comparatively recent speciation on or near Lundy. One climatic and geological study suggests "that the ancestors of Lundy cabbage and its beetles may have had the opportunity to colonise Lundy across land during a few hundred years around 10,800 years ago or may subsequently have been aided by [now gone] 'stepping stone' land to the north east" of the island.

== Description ==
External image
- Psylliodes luridipennis Photos on ARKive, including larvae, pupae and adults.

Psylliodes luridipennis adults are oblong-ovate, and the same size and build as P. hyoscyami, but not as broad, measuring between 2.8 and 3.6 mm in length. They have a brassy-green head and thorax, shining reddish-brown elytra and brassy-green legs. The hind femora are brassy in colour but paler at the base, and the antennae are brick-red. The adults are fully winged, and are capable of flight.

Its brassy colour, smaller size, and more finely and closely punctate-striate elytra distinguish it from its ally, P. chrysocephala, which is also found on Lundy. P. luridipennis is sometimes called the "bronze Lundy cabbage flea beetle" to differentiate it from another beetle found on the Lundy cabbage. This latter beetle, the "blue Lundy cabbage flea beetle", is a short-winged form of the widespread P. napi.

== Ecology and distribution ==
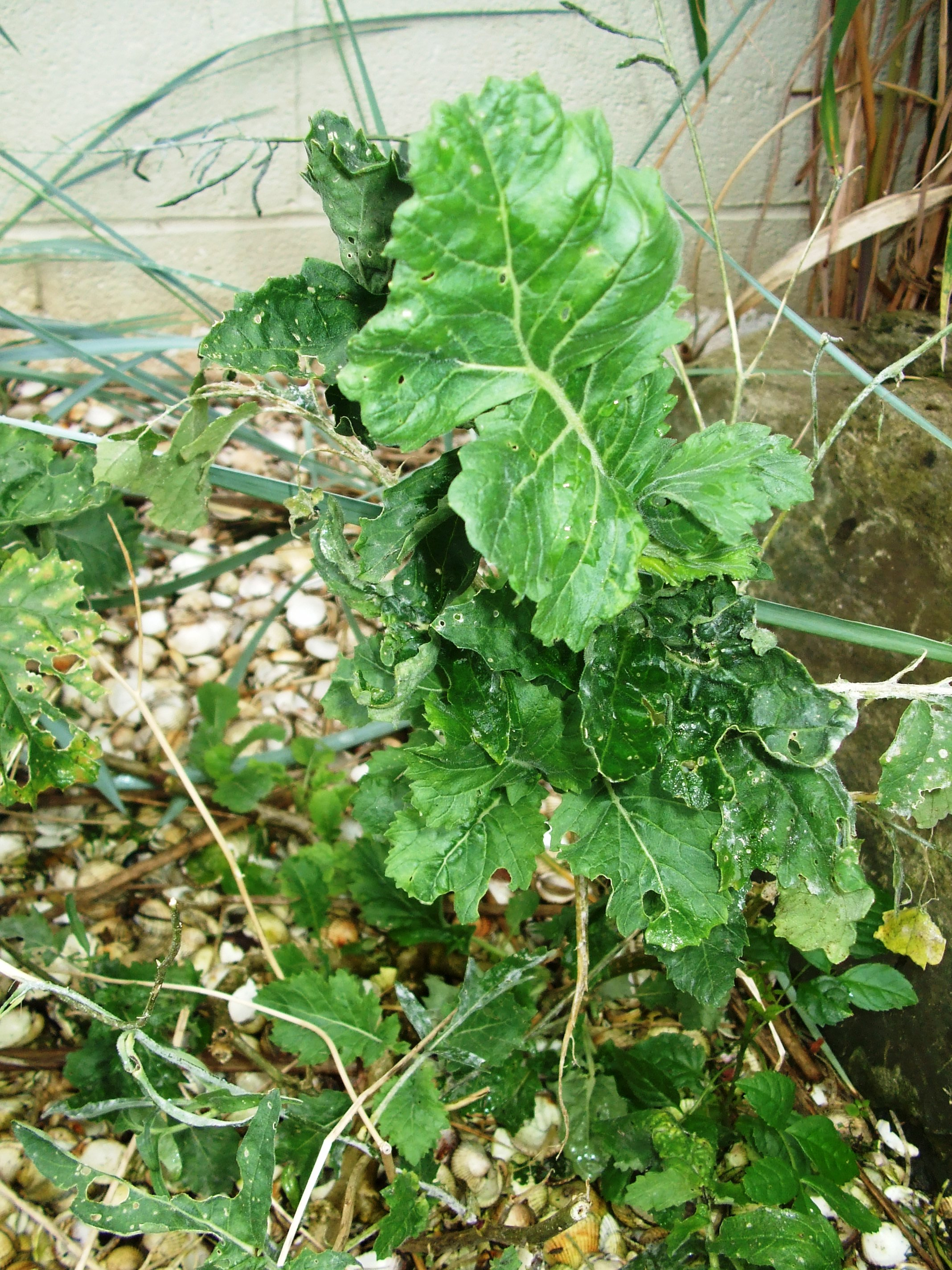
A specimen of the Lundy cabbage, growing at Bristol Zoo

Adult Psylliodes luridipennis beetles are invariably found on the Lundy cabbage (Coincya wrightii), a species endemic to the island of Lundy, where they feed on the leaves. They are not found on other locally occurring plants. However, researchers were also able to lure the beetles onto other crucifers taken from gardens. Two other taxa are known only from Lundy cabbages—the true weevil Ceutorhynchus contractus var. pallipes and an undescribed race of the flea beetle Psylliodes napi—making the plant unique to Britain as the only endemic species which is the exclusive host to endemic insect species. However, the Lundy cabbage is also host to a diverse variety of other invertebrate species.

Psylliodes luridipennis is found throughout the highly limited range of the Lundy cabbage, including sheer sea cliffs and further inland at Millcombe House. The insects also found their way to Lundy cabbages artificially seeded within the cabbage's range within a year. It had been hypothesised that P. luridipennis and Ceutorhynchus contractus var. pallipes may help pollinate the Lundy cabbage, but observations of the taxa indicate that neither visit flowers. While there are no honey bees on Lundy, other species of winged insects are present. The plant may rely primarily upon pollen beetles of the genus Meligethes and the wind for pollination.

Psylliodes luridipennis females lay their eggs on Lundy cabbage leaf stalks. The white larvae are leaf miners, digging into the petioles and stems. After emerging in late summer, they pupate in soil.

== Conservation ==
Along with the Lundy cabbage, Psylliodes luridipennis has been listed in the United Kingdom Biodiversity Action Plan, and an action plan for its conservation, along with the conservation of other endemic species, has been prepared. This plan revolves mostly around the control of Rhododendron ponticum, an alien species which threatens the Lundy cabbage. The beetle is threatened by fluctuating numbers of Lundy cabbages. Though it is quicker than P. napi to recolonise new growth after bad years for the cabbage, it is slower to recover than the cabbage itself.

The Joint Nature Conservation Committee recognise Psylliodes luridipennis as a "priority species" for conservation purposes, due to the fluctuating numbers of Lundy cabbages. Though the committee notes that "[h]ost plant numbers have been low, but relatively stable since 2001", it claims that P. luridipennis "has been noticeably difficult to find in recent years". Based on pre-1994 IUCN Red List guidelines, the species was informally deemed as "vulnerable".

== See also ==
- List of leaf beetle (Chrysomelidae) species recorded in Britain
- List of endemic species of the British Isles
