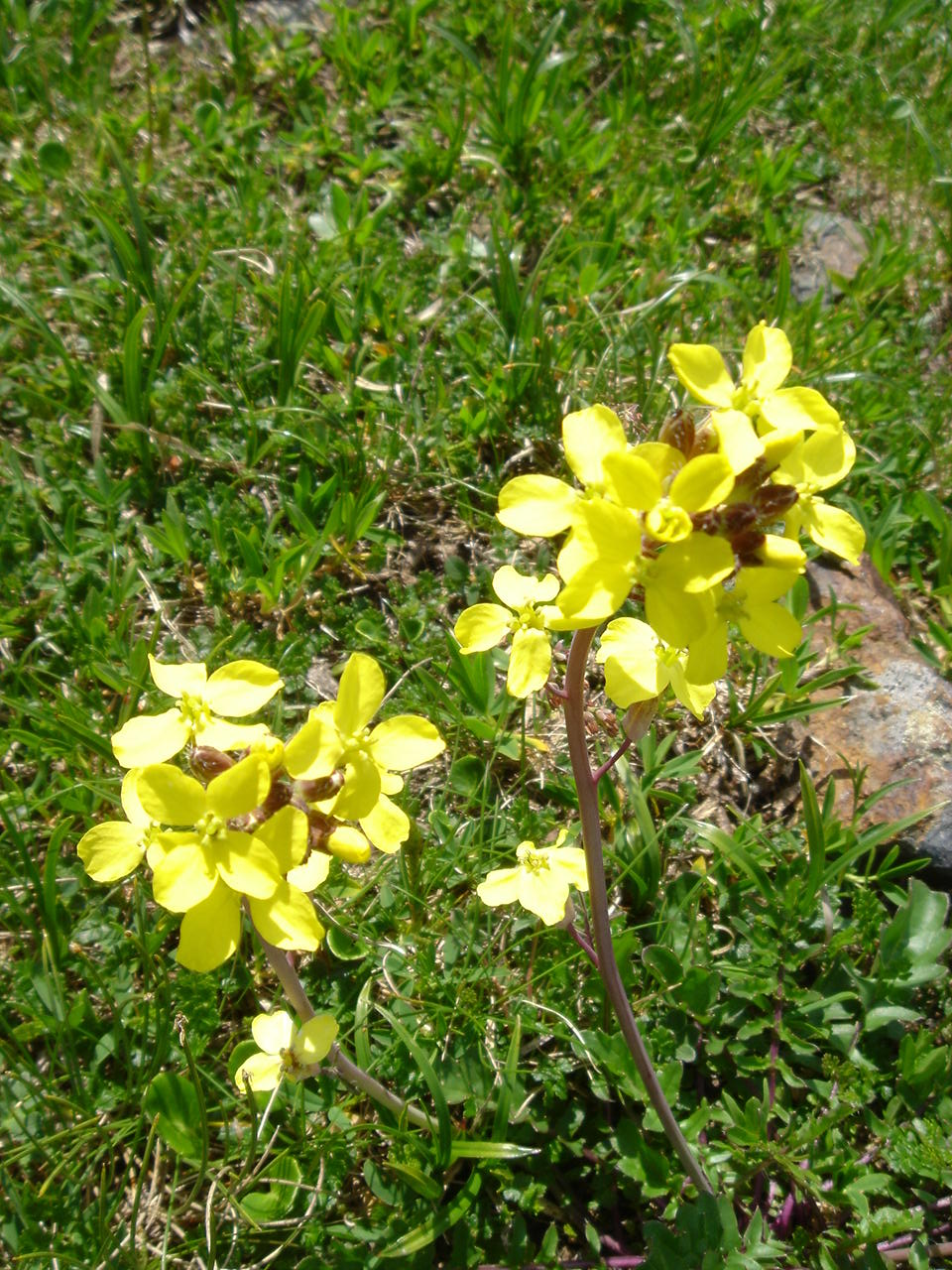

Scientific classification
- Kingdom: Plantae
- Clade: Embryophytes
- Clade: Tracheophytes
- Clade: Spermatophytes
- Clade: Angiosperms
- Clade: Eudicots
- Clade: Rosids
- Order: Brassicales
- Family: Brassicaceae
- Genus: Coincya
- Species: C. monensis
- Subspecies: C. m. subsp. recurvata

Trinomial name
- Coincya monensis subsp. recurvata (Leadlay, 1990)

= Coincya monensis subsp. recurvata =

Subspecies of flowering plant

Coincya monensis subsp. recurvata, the star mustard or wallflower cabbage, is a subspecies of Coincya monensis.

It is found in eight U.S. states. It may have been introduced to the U.S. as the Isle of Man cabbage and subsequently evolved through the founder effect and geographic isolation into a new subspecies.
