= Psylliodes convexior =

Scientific classification
- Kingdom: Animalia
- Phylum: Arthropoda
- Clade: Pancrustacea
- Class: Insecta
- Order: Coleoptera
- Suborder: Polyphaga
- Infraorder: Cucujiformia
- Family: Chrysomelidae
- Genus: Psylliodes
- Species: P. convexior

Binomial name
- Psylliodes convexior J. L. LeConte, 1857

Species of beetle

Psylliodes convexior, the hop flea beetle, is a species of flea beetle in the family Chrysomelidae. It is found in Central America and North America.
