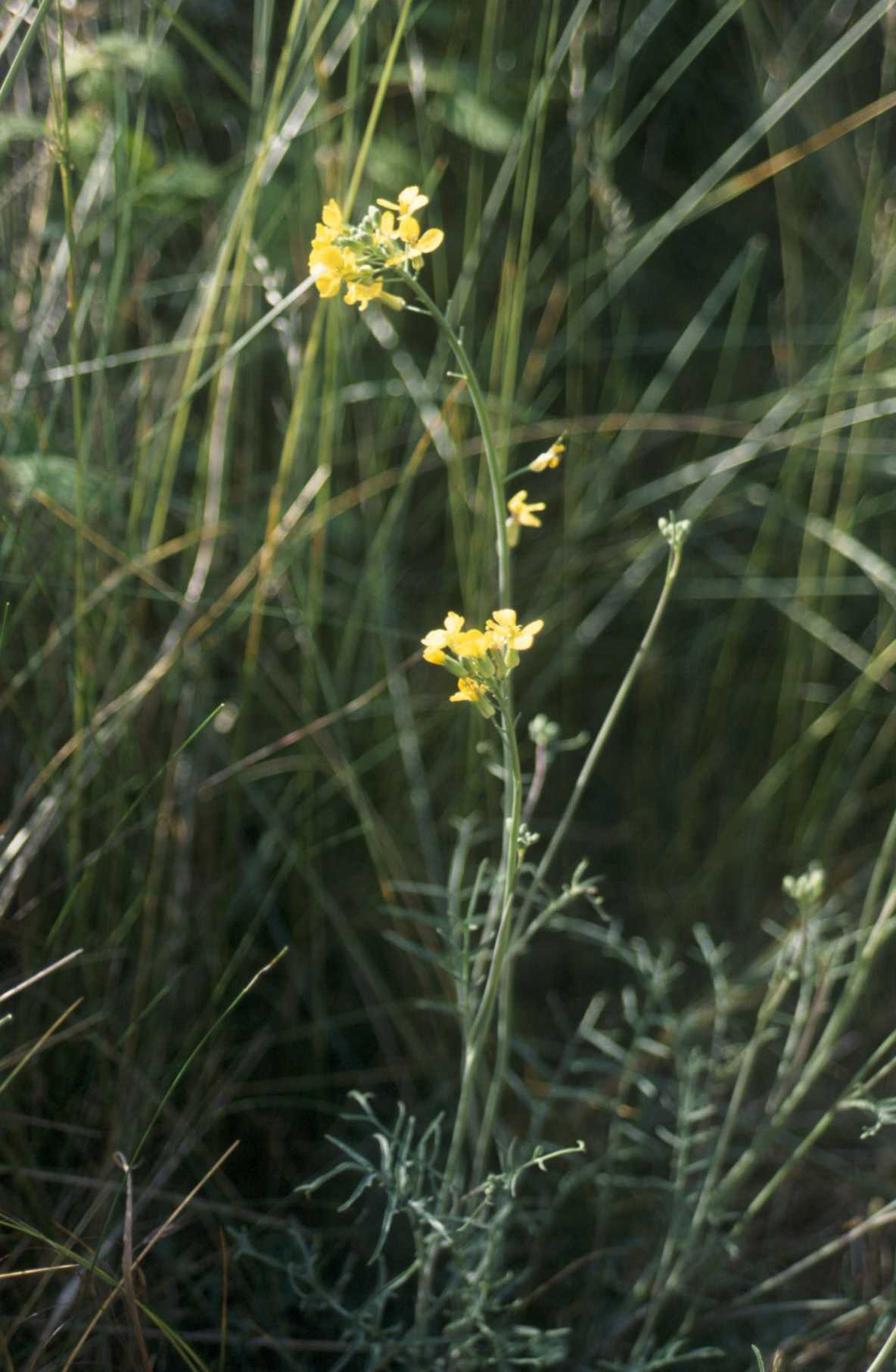

Scientific classification
- Kingdom: Plantae
- Clade: Tracheophytes
- Clade: Angiosperms
- Clade: Eudicots
- Clade: Rosids
- Order: Brassicales
- Family: Brassicaceae
- Genus: Coincya
- Species: C. monensis L. Greuter & Burdet
- Subspecies: C. m. subsp. monensis

Trinomial name
- Coincya monensis subsp. monensis

= Coincya monensis subsp. monensis =

Isle of Man cabbage

Subspecies of flowering plant

Coincya monensis subsp. monensis, the Isle of Man cabbage, is a species of plant in the family Brassicaceae that is found in coastal habitats on the west of the island of Great Britain (from north Devon to Kintyre) and around the coasts of the Isle of Man.

== Conservation status ==
The subspecies is thought to naturally occur in only 22 localities and is endemic to the British Isles. It is listed as a nationally scarce British species and is in serious risk of extinction. The species was once abundant on the Isle of Man, hence its name, however, for an unknown reason its population has collapsed to only a few individual and isolated plants. On the Isle of Man, the Manx Wildlife Trust began propagating the species in their greenhouses in 2006. It is hoped that this will halt the decline of the species and prevent its extinction. In 2022 it was added to the Isle of Man’s red-list of plants of conservation concern.

== Habitat ==
The plant prefers light (sandy), medium (loamy) and heavy (clay) soils, which must be well-drained yet moist. The plant can grow in acidic, neutral and alkaline soils, in semi-shade (light woodland) or no shade. Coincya monensis subsp. monensis needs mobile sand dunes where wind or other erosion prevents thick vegetation cover and allows areas free from vegetation cover for C. m. subsp. monensis to colonise. Trampling by walkers can help achieve this habitat, hence C. m. monensis can often be found growing along footpaths through coastal dunes.

== Biology ==
The Isle-of-Man cabbage, a dicot plant, is biennial and grows to a height of 0.3 metres (1 ft 0 in). It forms rosettes than can be up to 1 metre (3 ft 3 in) in diameter. The flowers have four leaves, are hermaphrodite and are pollinated by insects. Coincya monensis subsp monensis flowers from April.

== Taxonomy ==
Other subspecies in the genus Coincya are the Lundy cabbage, Coincya wrightii, and the star mustard, Coincya monensis subsp. recurvata. The star mustard, a plant introduced to eight U.S. states, is the same species as the Isle of Man cabbage but a different subspecies. It may have been introduced to the U.S. as the Isle-of Man cabbage and subsequently evolved through the founder effect and geographic isolation into a new subspecies.

The Manx name for the species is caayl Vannin, literally 'Manx cabbage'. Outside the British Isles, the Isle of Man cabbage is also known as the star mustard, wallflower cabbage, tall wallflower cabbage and coincya.

In its scientific name, the specific descriptor monensis is Latin for Manx. In Latin, the Isle of Man is called Monapia.
