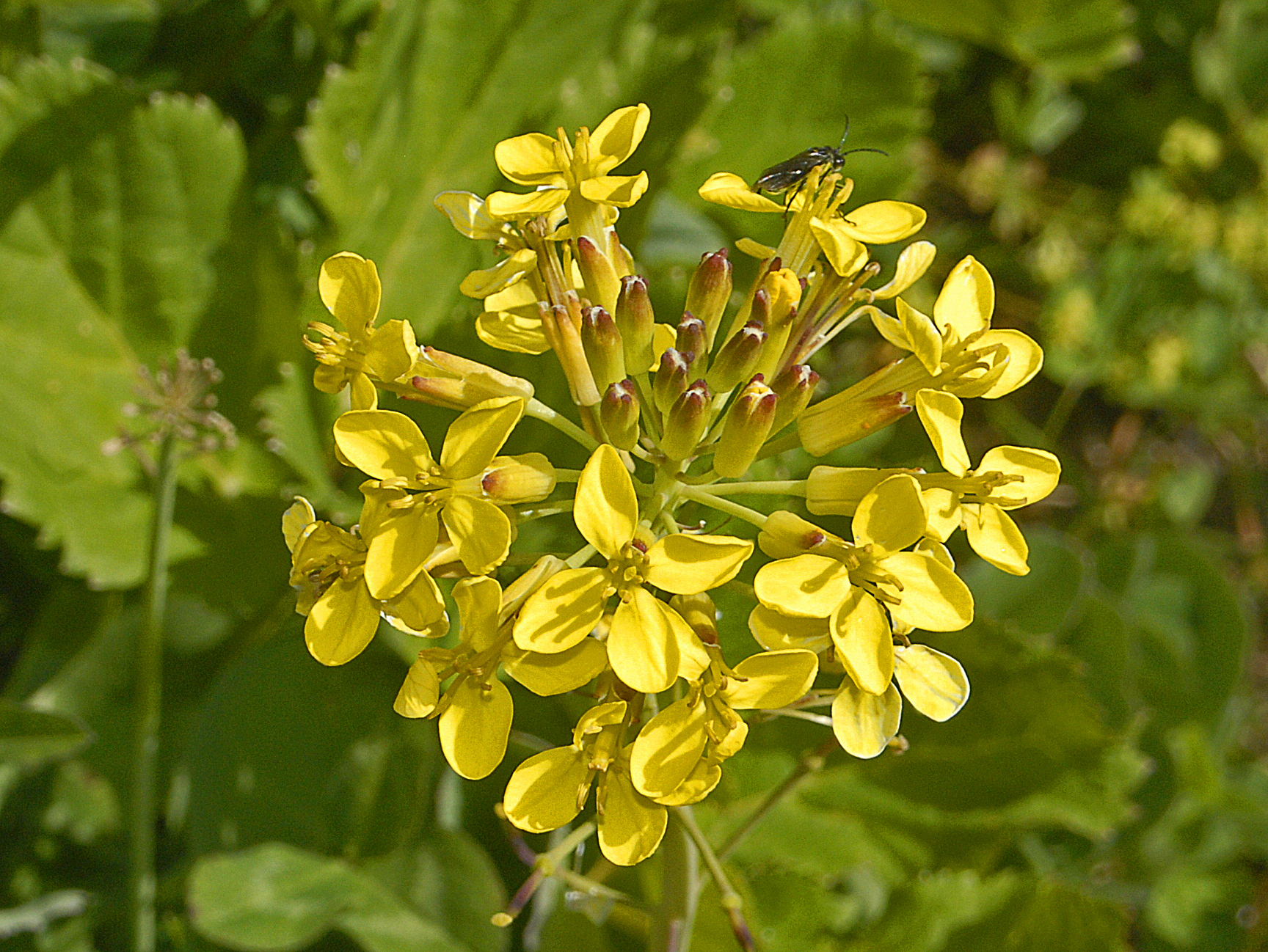
- Flowers of Coincya richeri at the Giardino Botanico Alpino Chanousia

Scientific classification
- Kingdom: Plantae
- Clade: Tracheophytes
- Clade: Angiosperms
- Clade: Eudicots
- Clade: Rosids
- Order: Brassicales
- Family: Brassicaceae
- Genus: Coincya
- Species: C. richeri

Binomial name
- Coincya richeri (Vill.) Greuter & Burdet

Synonyms
- Brassica richeri Vili.; Hutera richeri (Vill.) Gómez-Campo; Rhynchosinapis richeri (Vill.) Heywood; Rynchosinapis richeri Hayek

= Coincya richeri =

Species of flowering plant

Coincya richeri is a plant species in the family Brassicaceae.

== Description ==
Coincya richeri can reach a height of 20–50 centimetres (7.9–19.7 in). This perennial herbaceous plant has a leafy stem and a basal rosettes of oblong-ovate leaves with a long petiole and serrated edges. The stalked hermaphrodite flowers are 15–20 millimetres (0.59–0.79 in) wide, with four yellow petals arranged in dense clusters at the top of the stem. The pods are crossed by three ribs. They bloom from June to August.

== Distribution ==
This plant is endemic to the Western Alps from Monte Viso to Mont Cenis.

== Habitat ==
This rare species can be found in on calcareous soils, debris, cracks in rocks and pastures at elevation of 900–2,400 metres (3,000–7,900 ft) above sea level.
