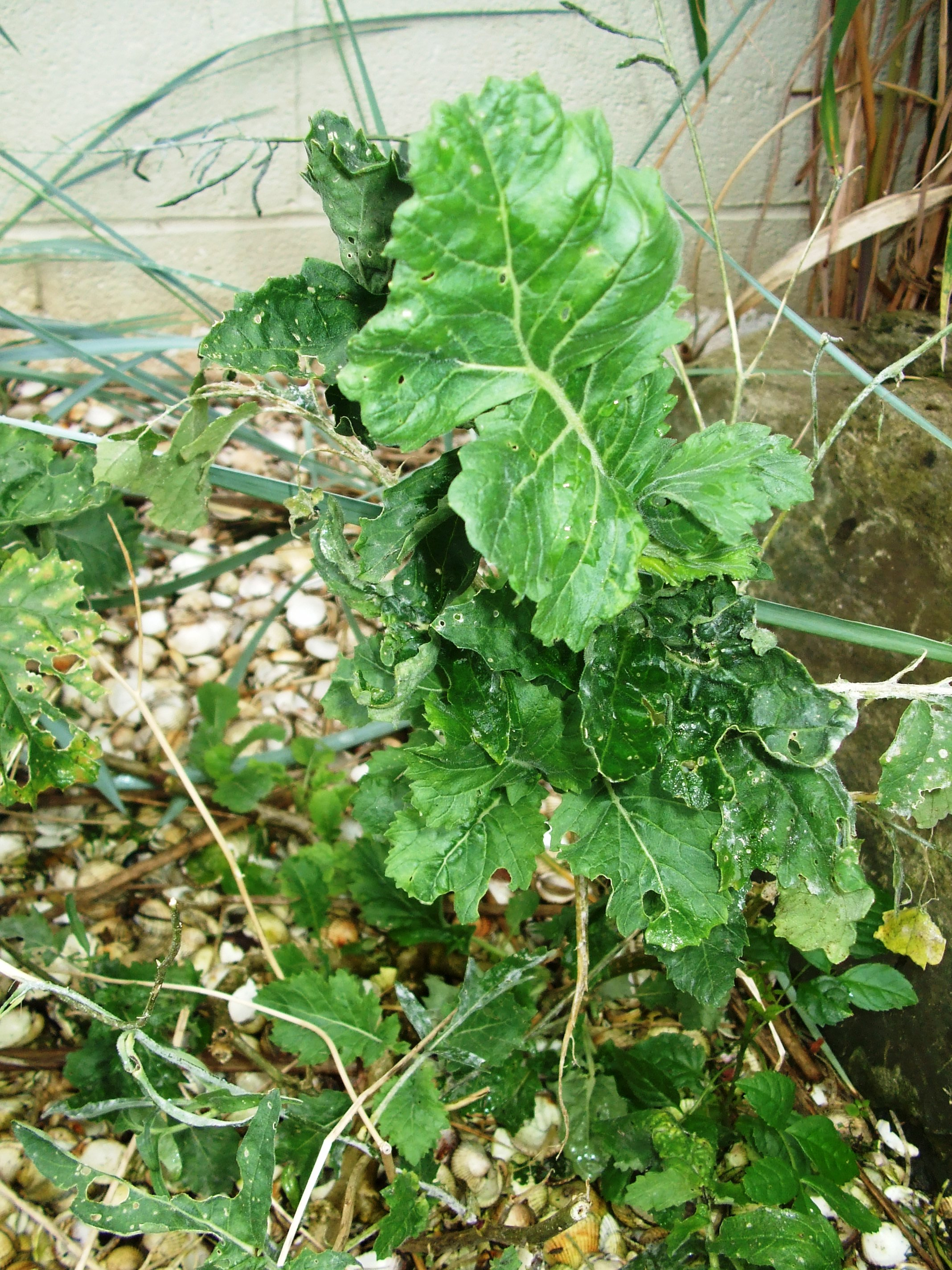

Scientific classification
- Kingdom: Plantae
- Clade: Tracheophytes
- Clade: Angiosperms
- Clade: Eudicots
- Clade: Rosids
- Order: Brassicales
- Family: Brassicaceae
- Genus: Coincya
- Species: C. wrightii

Binomial name
- Coincya wrightii O. E. Schulz

= Coincya wrightii =

Lundy cabbage

Species of flowering plant

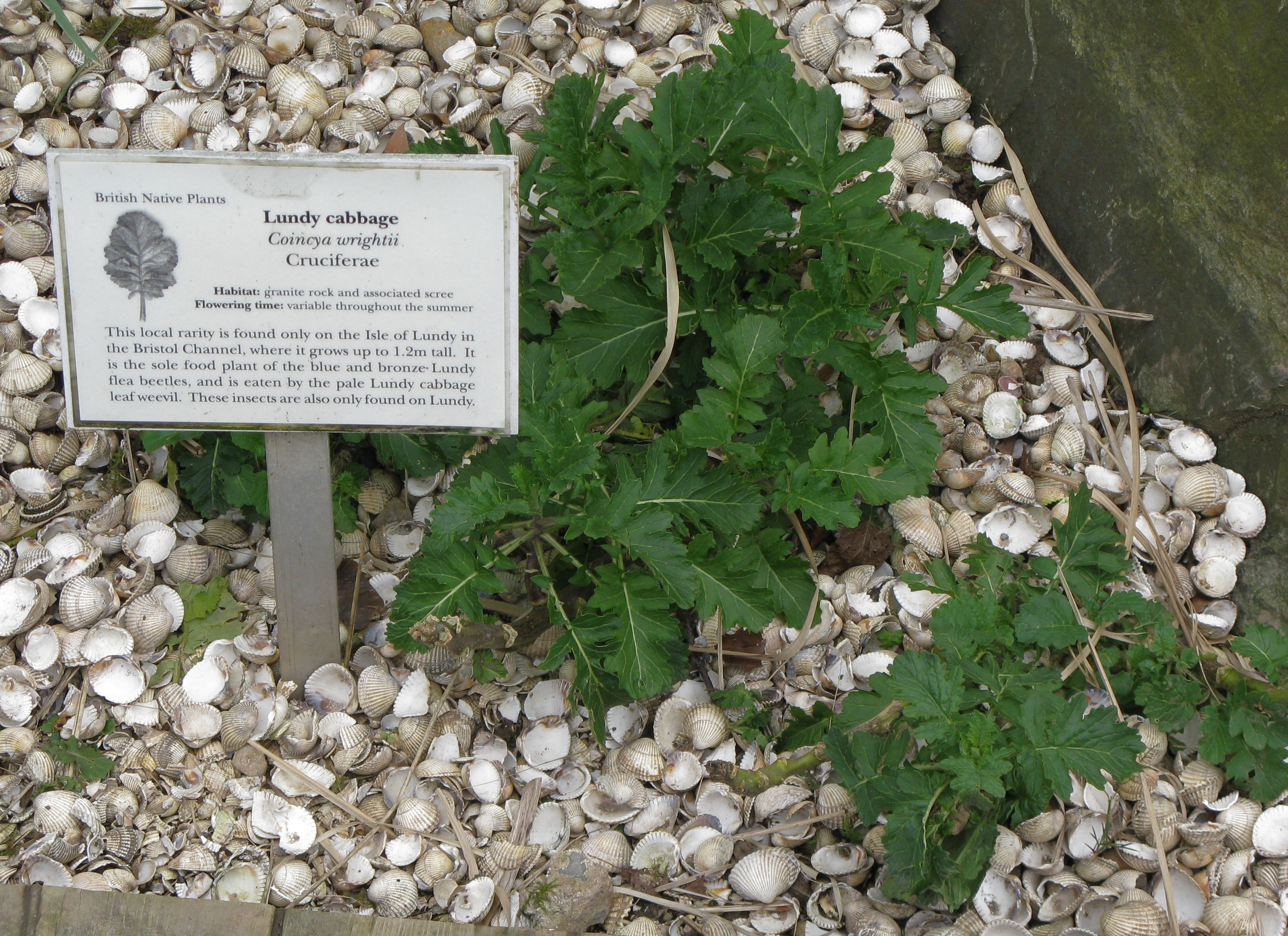
Lundy cabbage growing at Bristol Zoo, England

Coincya wrightii, known as Lundy cabbage, is a species of primitive brassicoid, endemic to the island of Lundy off the southwestern coast of England, where it is sufficiently isolated to have formed its own species, with its endemic phytophagous beetles. Coincya wrightii grows natively only on the eastern cliffs and slopes of the island and nowhere else in the world and is a protected species. It reaches up to a metre in height and with its yellow flowers (seen from May to August) it looks a little similar to oil seed rape. Although it is a member of the cabbage family, it tastes unpleasant – it has been described as "triple-distilled essence of Brussels sprout".

The Lundy cabbage is unique in that two species of beetles that feed on it – the Lundy cabbage flea beetle (Psylliodes luridipennis) and the Lundy cabbage weevil (Ceutorhynchus contractus pallipes) – also occur nowhere else in the world. The number of Lundy cabbages varies from year to year. Grazing by goats, sheep and rabbits is a problem, along with suppression by the invasive alien Rhododendron bushes that have been spreading across the island.

It is an excellent example of isolation on an island leading to the production of unique species.

== See also ==
- Isle of Man cabbage
