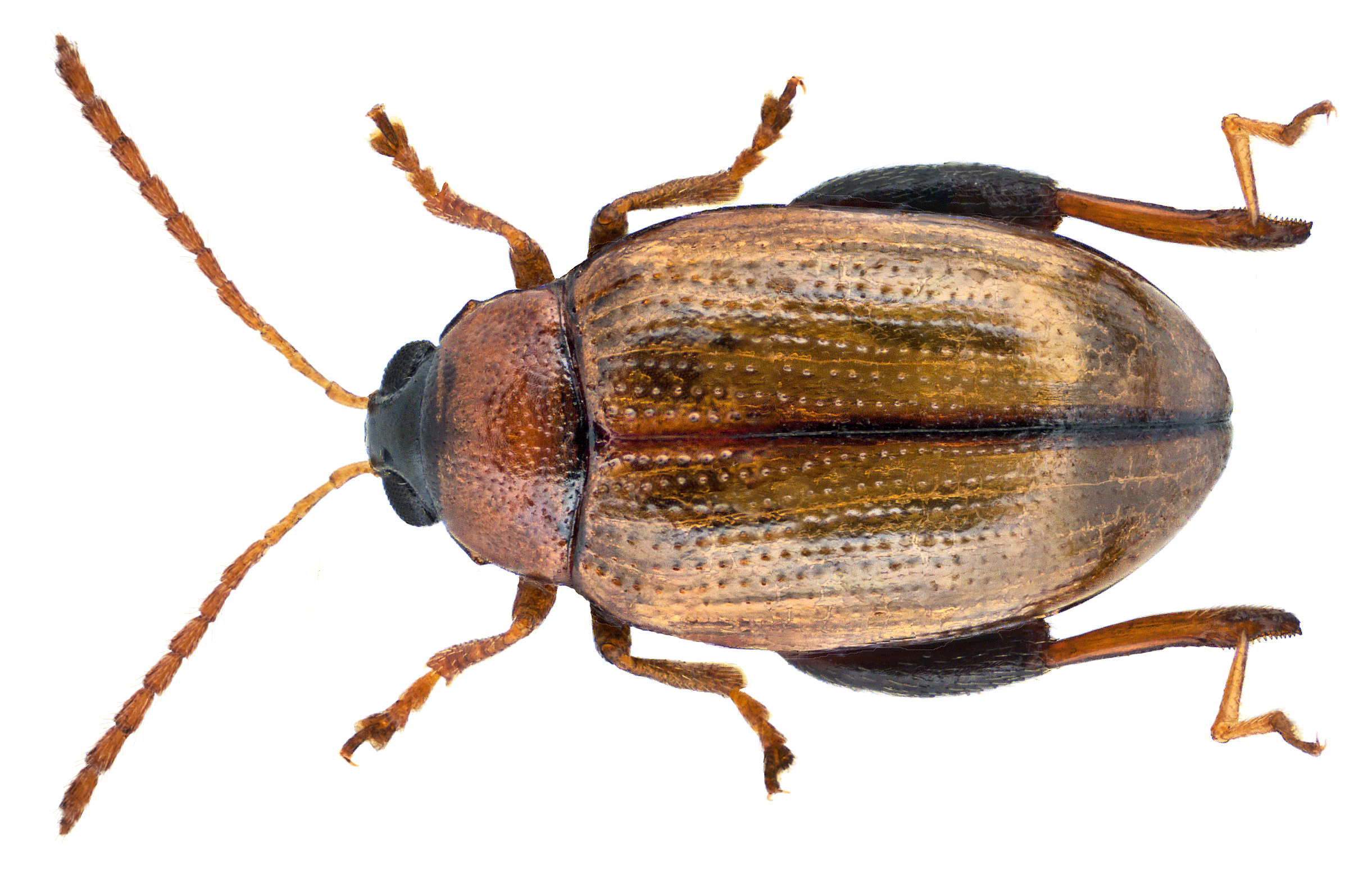

Scientific classification
- Kingdom: Animalia
- Phylum: Arthropoda
- Clade: Pancrustacea
- Class: Insecta
- Order: Coleoptera
- Suborder: Polyphaga
- Infraorder: Cucujiformia
- Family: Chrysomelidae
- Genus: Psylliodes
- Species: P. affinis

Binomial name
- Psylliodes affinis (Paykull, 1799)

= Psylliodes affinis =

Species of beetle

Psylliodes affinis, the potato flea beetle, is a species of flea beetle in the family Chrysomelidae. It is found in Europe and Northern Asia (excluding China) and North America.
