= Etelka A. Leadlay =

British botanist (born 1947)

Etelka Anne Leadlay (born 1947) is a British botanist.

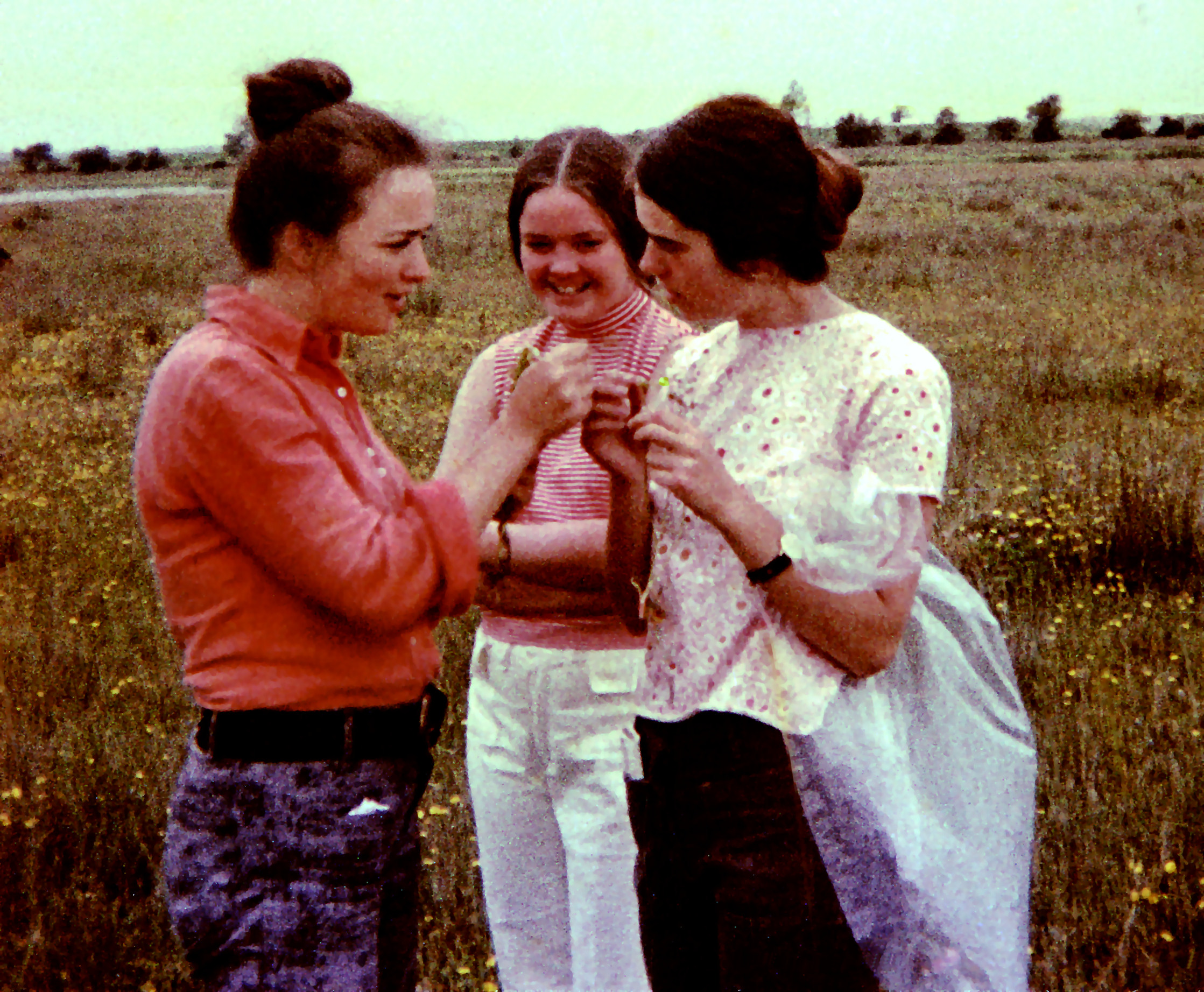
Leadlay (left) in 1973

Born in Lambeth on 16 September 1947, she attended St Mary's School, Calne, Wiltshire. Later she studied for a M.Sc. in Pure and Applied Plant Taxonomy (1973) at the University of Reading, and a Ph.D. "The biology and systematics of the genus Hutera Porta" (1978). She and was elected a Fellow of the Linnean Society in 1978.

She worked for over 20 years for Botanic Gardens Conservation International (BGCI), based on Kew Green, as Head of Research and Membership Services, until she retired in 2007. In 2006, she co-edited "Taxonomy and Plant Conservation".

Etelka married John F Davey in 1978. They have a daughter.

== Selected publications ==
- The Darwin Technical Manual for Botanic Gardens. Etelka Leadlay (Editor), Jane Greene (Editor). (1998). Botanic Gardens Conservation International (BGCI). ISBN 978-0952027560
- Report of the 2nd World Botanic Gardens Congress, Barcelona, Spain. (2004). BGjournal 1(1) 7–14. JSTOR 24809917
- The BGCI contribution to the implementation of the Global Strategy for Plant Conservation. Leadlay, E., Sharrock, S., & Simiyu, S. (2005). BGjournal, 2(2), 3–7. JSTOR 24809960
- Taxonomy and plant conservation: the cornerstone of the conservation and the sustainable use of plants. Leadlay, Etelka and Jury, Stephen (eds.). Cambridge University Press, Cambridge (2006) ISBN 9780521607209
- The International Agenda for Botanic Gardens in Conservation and the 2010 Targets for Botanic Gardens. (2006). BGjournal (1) 3–4. JSTOR 24810072
- Report on 3rd Global Botanic Gardens Congress Wuhan, China. (2007). BGjournal 4(2) 34–35. JSTOR 24810601
