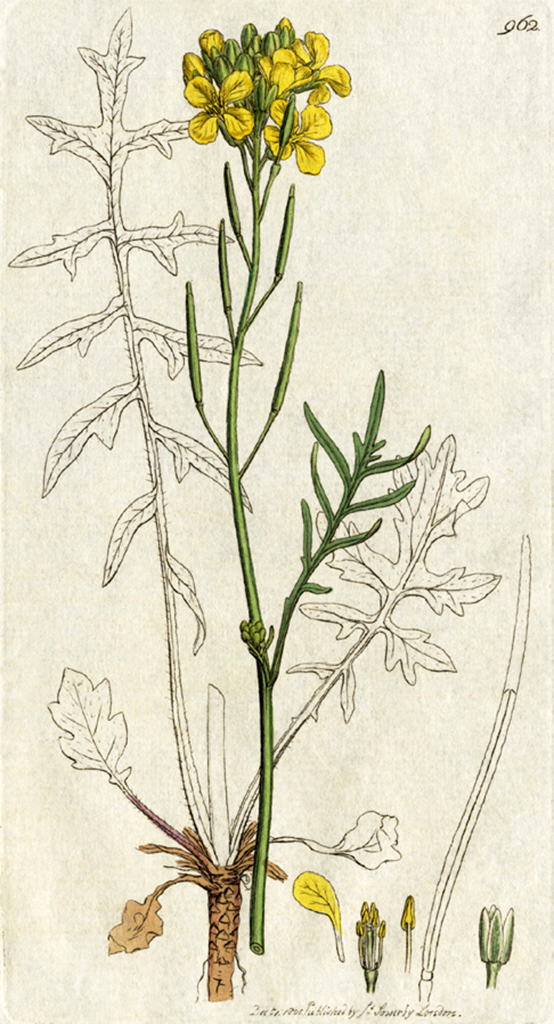

Conservation status
- Least Concern (IUCN 3.1)

- Unrankable (NatureServe)

Scientific classification
- Kingdom: Plantae
- Clade: Tracheophytes
- Clade: Angiosperms
- Clade: Eudicots
- Clade: Rosids
- Order: Brassicales
- Family: Brassicaceae
- Genus: Coincya
- Species: C. monensis

Binomial name
- Coincya monensis (L.) Greuter & Burdet (1983)

Synonyms
- Sisymbrium monense L. (1753)

= Coincya monensis =

Species of flowering plant

Coincya monensis is a plant species in the family Brassicaceae. Coincya monensis is native to western Europe and Morocco, but has been introduced in North America.

== Subspecies ==
It contains the subspecies:

- C. monensis subsp. cheiranthos (Vill.) Aedo, Leadlay & Muñoz Garm. (Wallflower Cabbage) — France, Germany & Spain
- C. monensis subsp. hispida (Cav.) Leadlay — central Portugal & central Spain
- C. monensis subsp. monensis (Isle of Man cabbage) — the British Isles
- C. monensis subsp. nevadensis (Willk.) Leadlay — southern Spain
- C. monensis subsp. orophila (Franco) Aedo, Leadlay & Muñoz Garm. — Morocco, Portugal & Spain
- C. monensis subsp. puberula (Pau) Leadlay — northern Portugal & northern Spain
- C. monensis subsp. recurvata (All.) Leadlay (Star mustard) — United States
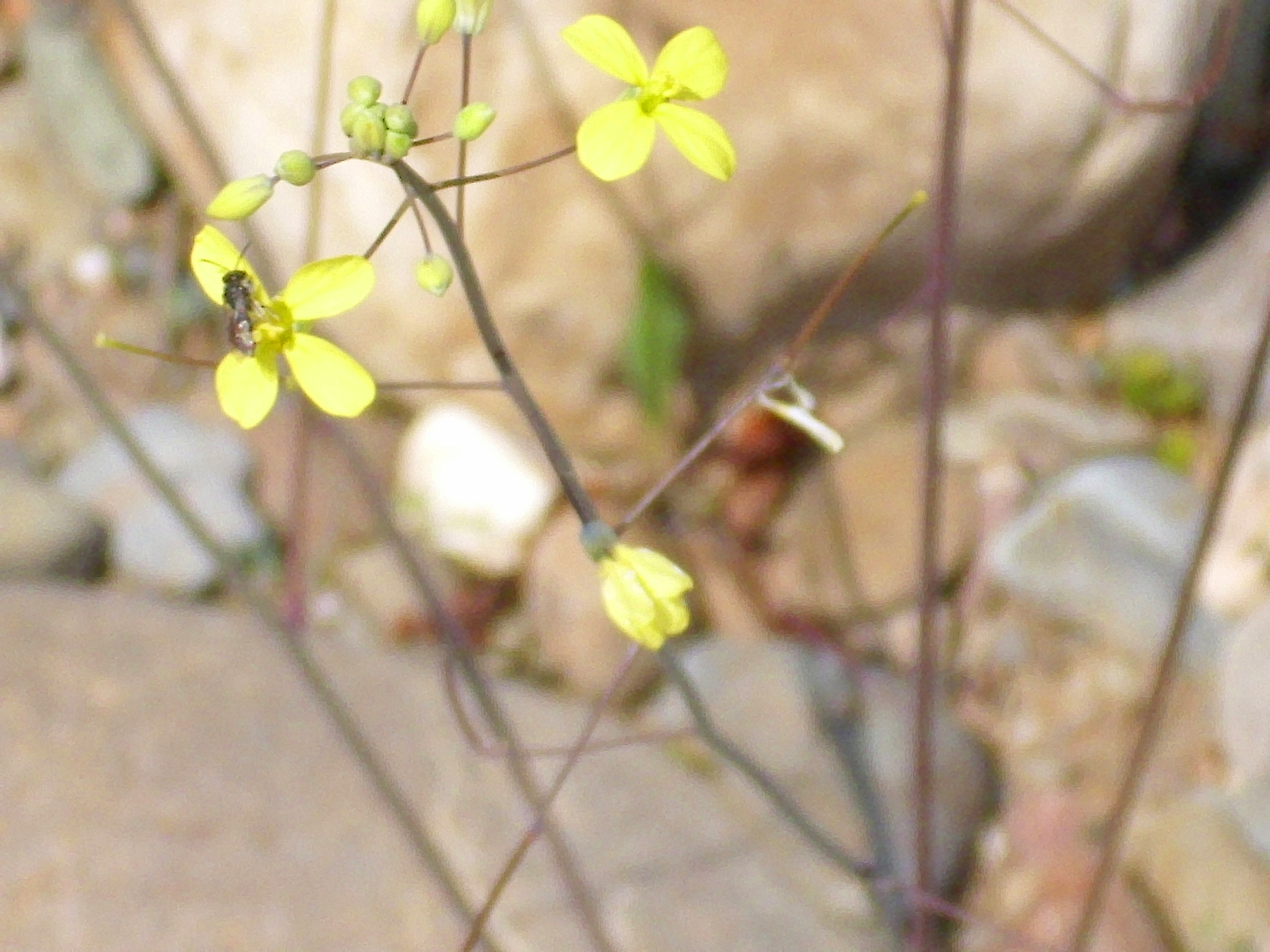
Coincya monensis subsp. hispida

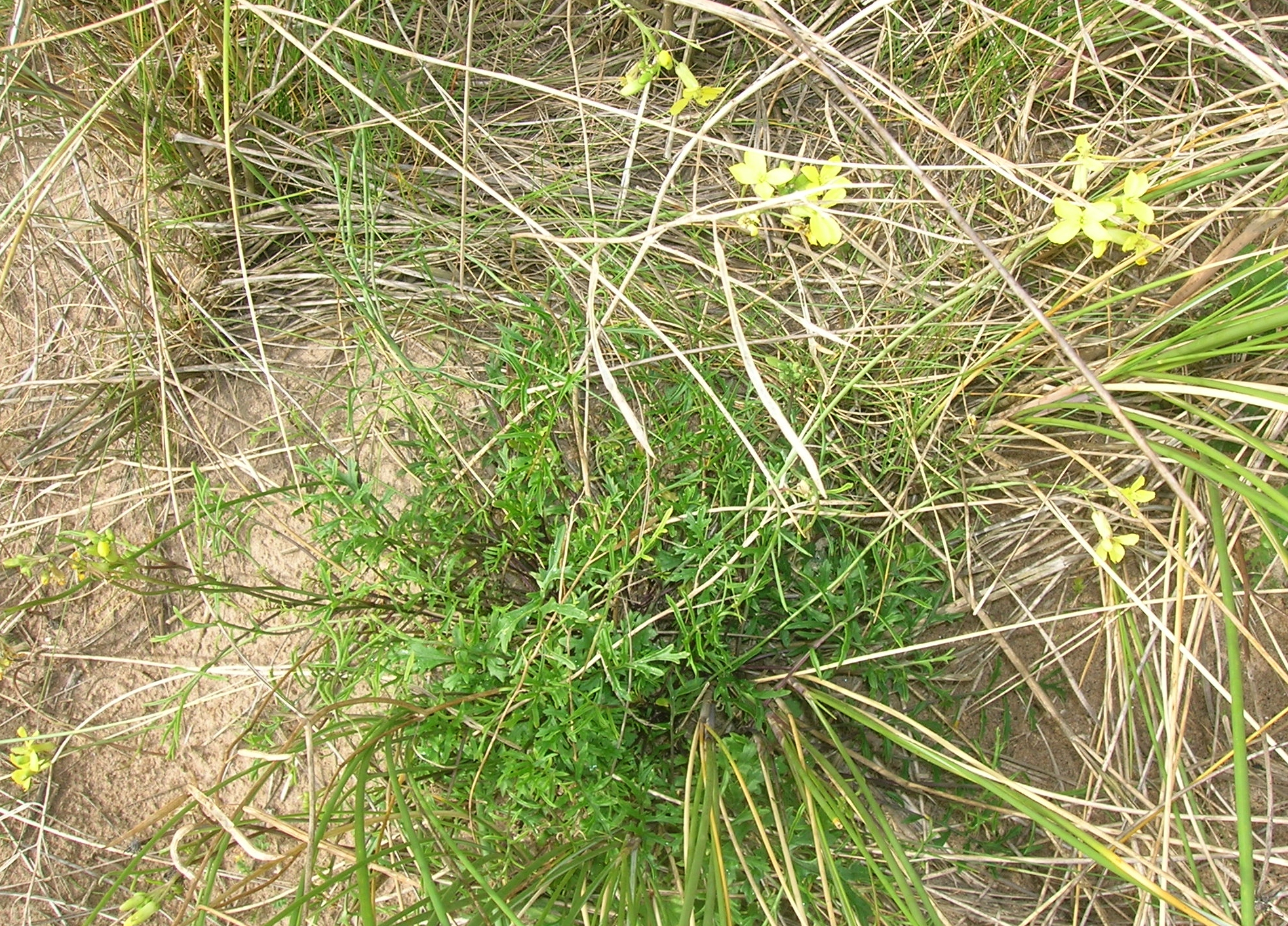
Coincya monensis subsp. monensis

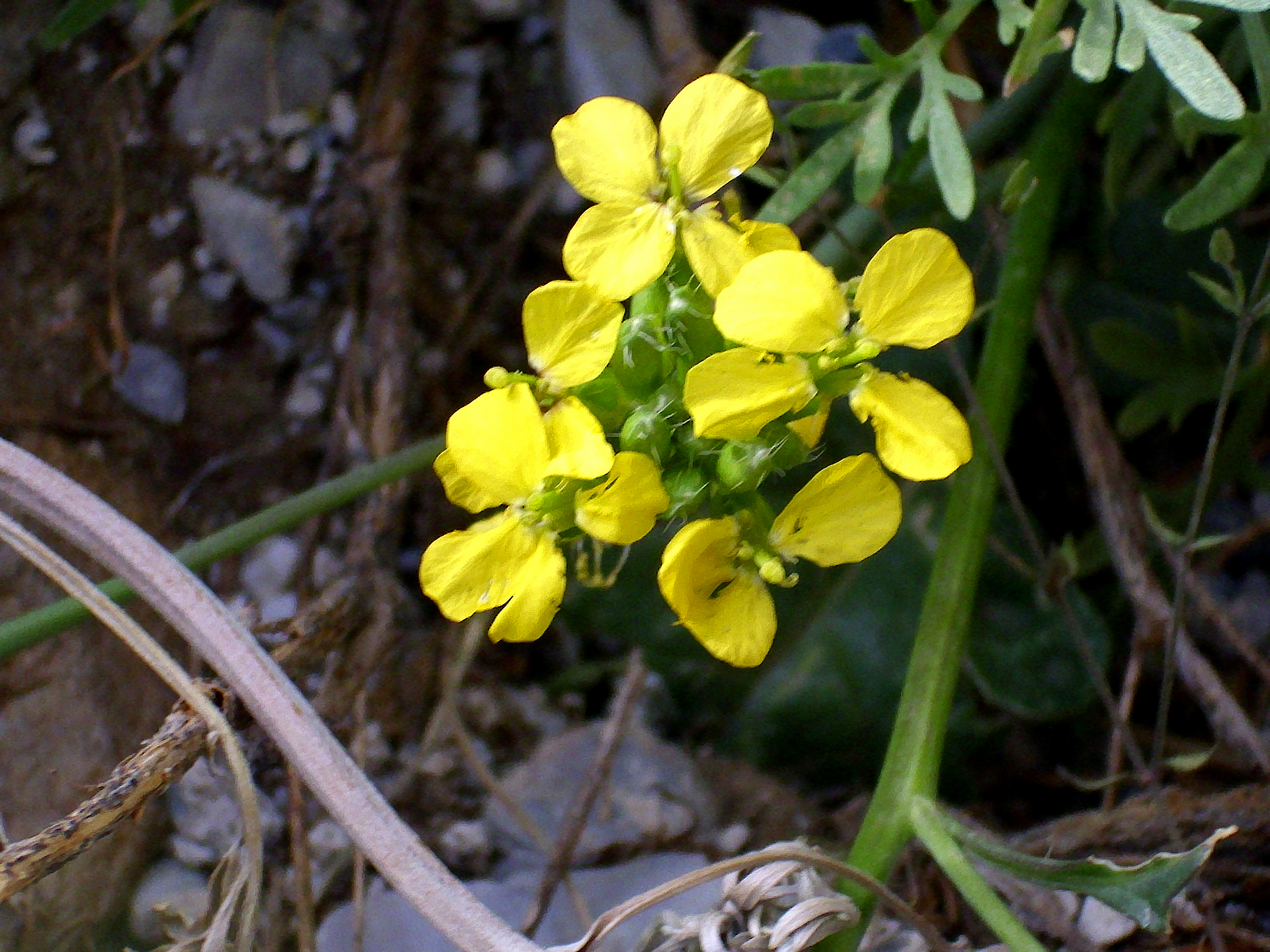
Coincya monensis subsp. nevadensis
