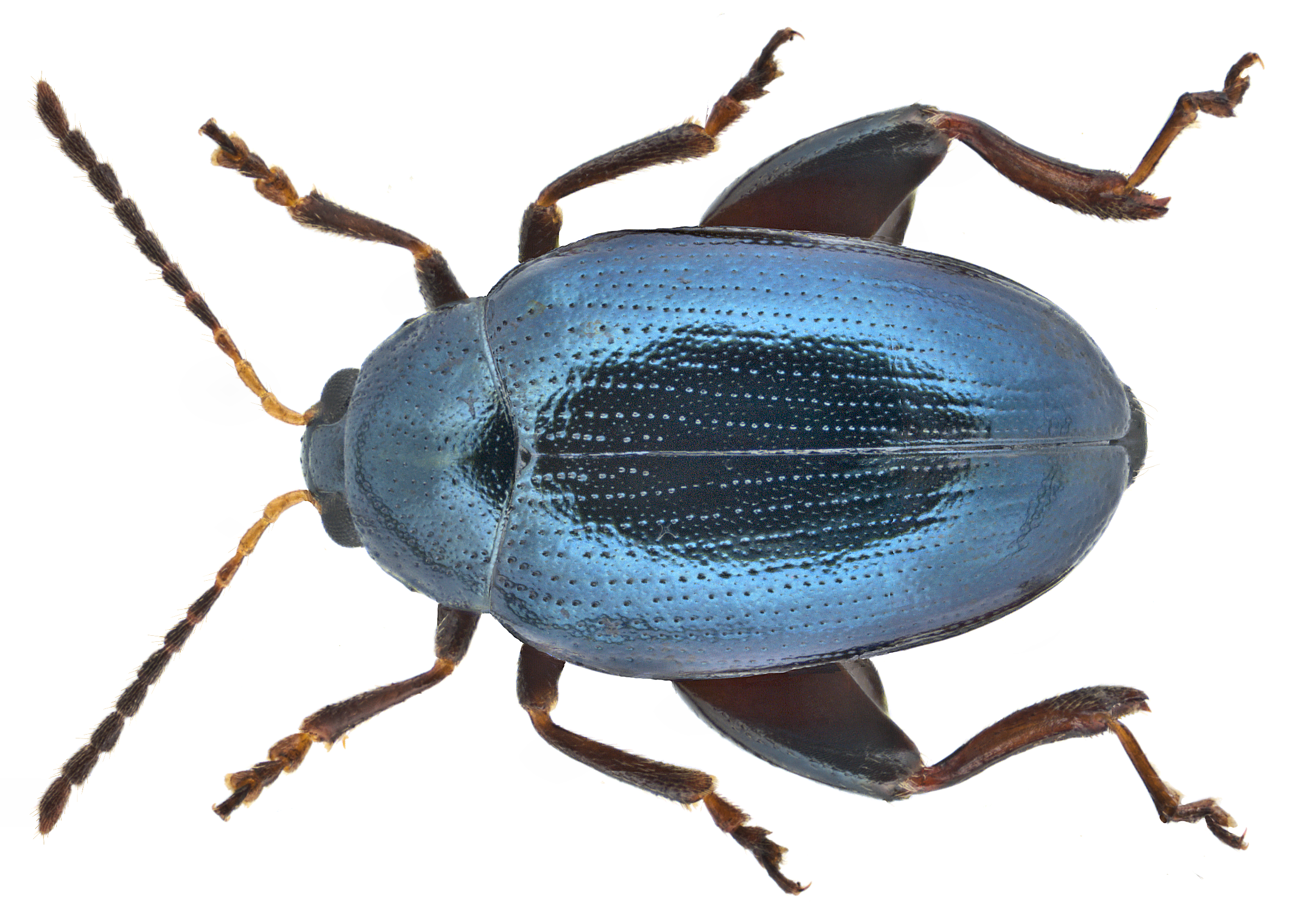
- Psylliodes dulcamarae (Koch, 1803)

Scientific classification
- Kingdom: Animalia
- Phylum: Arthropoda
- Class: Insecta
- Order: Coleoptera
- Suborder: Polyphaga
- Infraorder: Cucujiformia
- Superfamily: Chrysomeloidea
- Family: Chrysomelidae
- Subfamily: Galerucinae
- Tribe: Alticini
- Genus: Psylliodes; Latreille, 1829

Synonyms
- Eupus Wollaston, 1854; Semicnema Weise, 1888; Psyllobactra Lopatin, 1976; Minicnema Nadein, 2007

= Psylliodes =

Genus of beetles

Psylliodes is a large genus of flea beetles in the family Chrysomelidae. There are about 200 described species worldwide.

== Selected species ==
- Psylliodes affinis (Paykull, 1799) (potato flea beetle)
- Psylliodes chalcomera (Illiger, 1807)
- Psylliodes chrysocephala (Linnaeus, 1758) (cabbage stem flea beetle)
- Psylliodes convexior J. L. LeConte, 1857 (hop flea beetle)
- Psylliodes credens Fall, 1933
- Psylliodes cucullatus (Illiger, 1807)
- Psylliodes elegans Horn, 1889
- Psylliodes guatemalensis Jacoby, 1885
- Psylliodes luridipennis Kutschera, 1864 (bronze Lundy cabbage flea beetle)
- Psylliodes luteolus (Müller, 1776)
- Psylliodes napi (Fabricius, 1792)
- Psylliodes picinus (Marsham, 1802)
- Psylliodes punctulatus F. E. Melsheimer, 1847 (hop flea beetle)
- Psylliodes sublaevis Horn, 1889
- Psylliodes verisimilis Fall, 1933

== Gallery ==
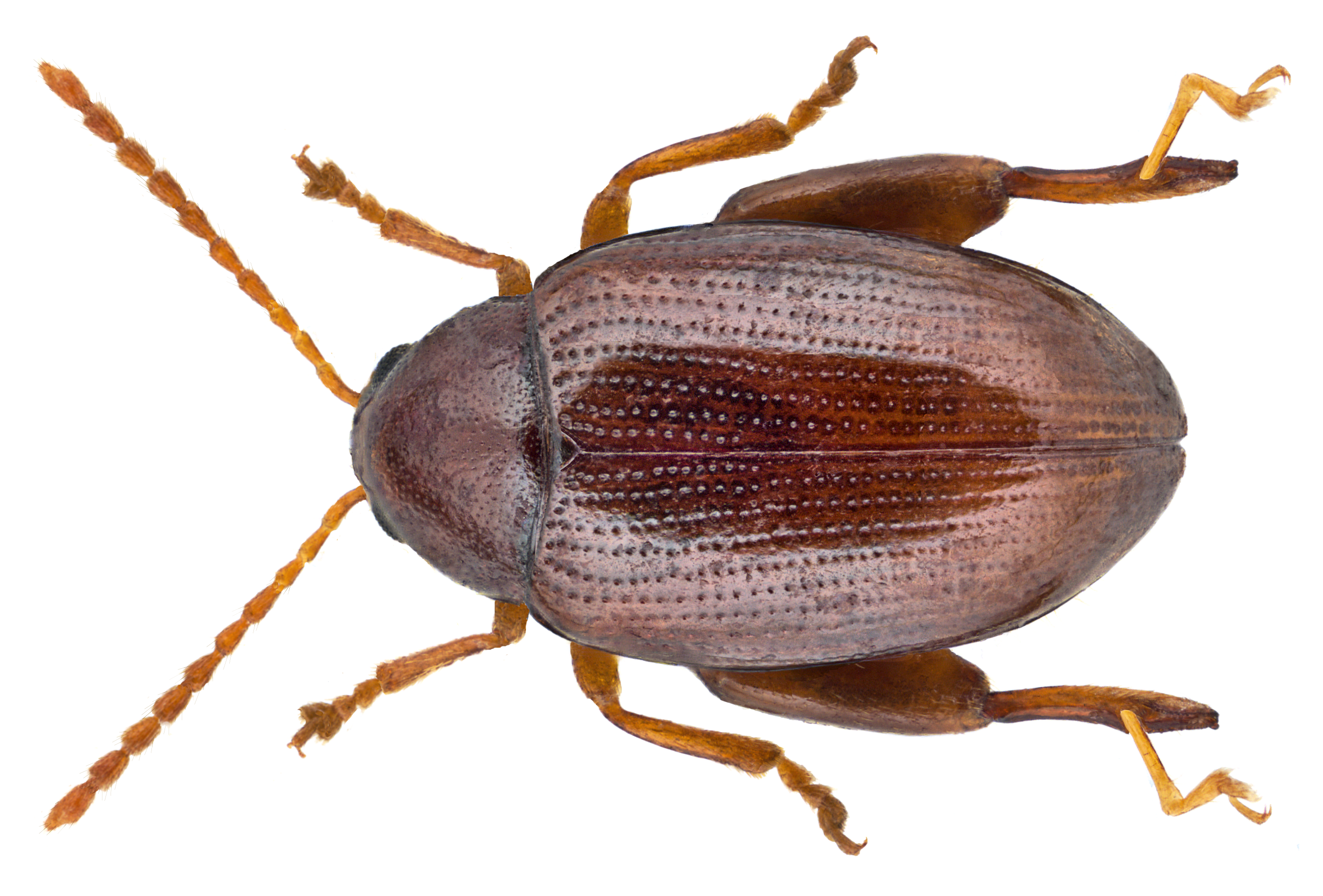
Psylliodes luteolus

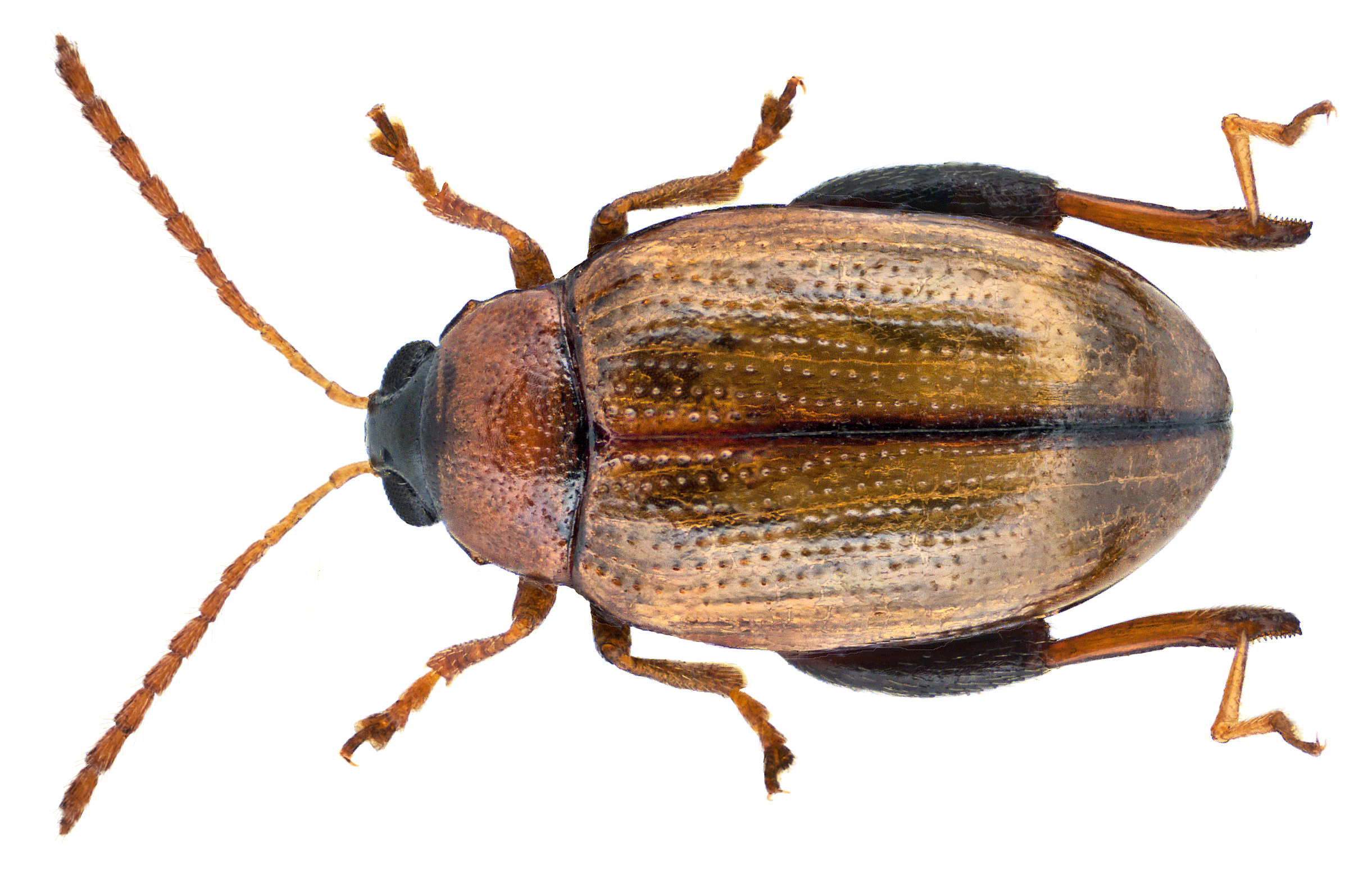
Psylliodes affinis

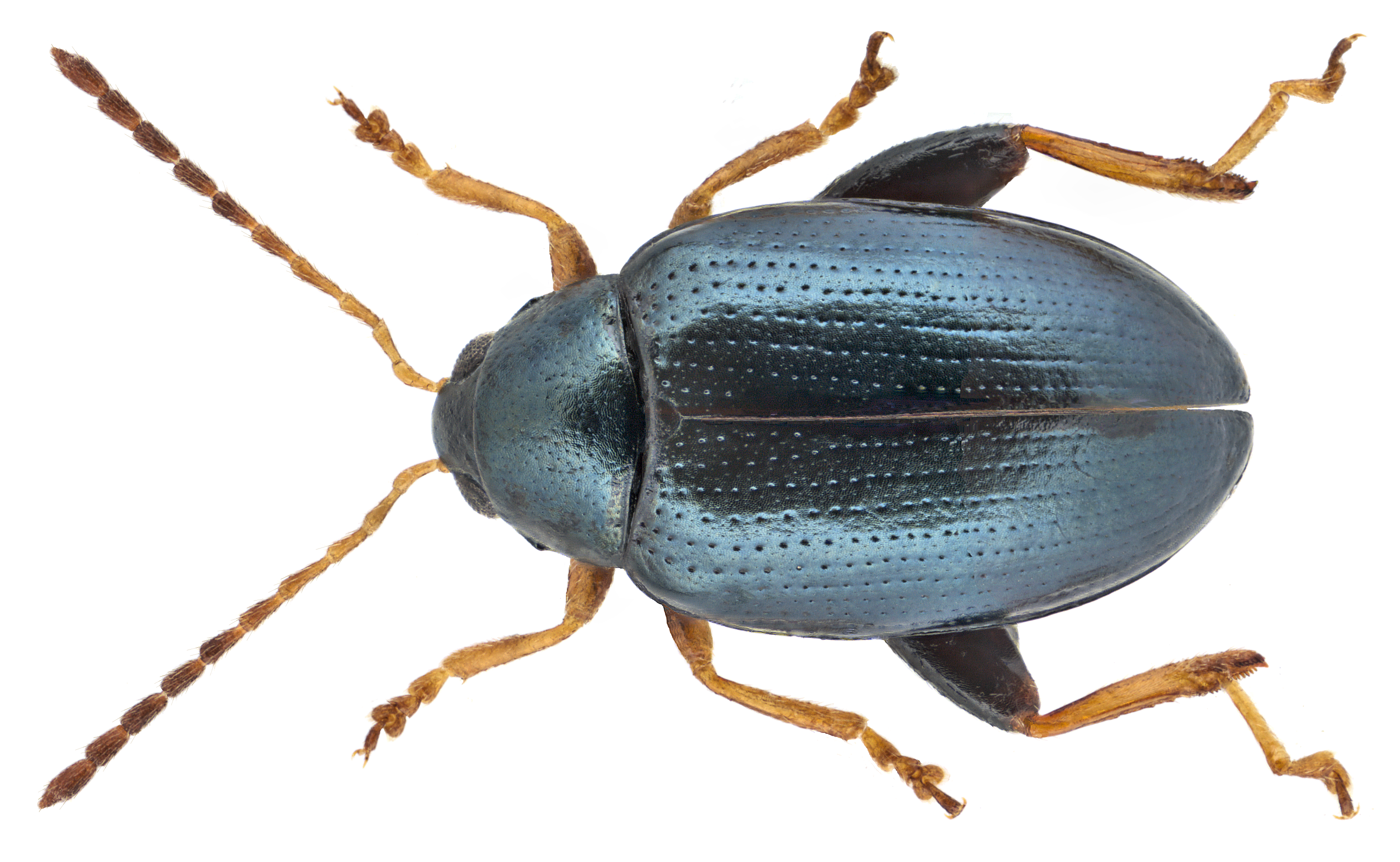
Psylliodes napi
