= Psylliodes credens =

Scientific classification
- Kingdom: Animalia
- Phylum: Arthropoda
- Class: Insecta
- Order: Coleoptera
- Suborder: Polyphaga
- Infraorder: Cucujiformia
- Family: Chrysomelidae
- Genus: Psylliodes
- Species: P. credens

Binomial name
- Psylliodes credens Fall, 1933

Species of beetle

Psylliodes credens is a species of flea beetle in the family Chrysomelidae. It is found in North America.
