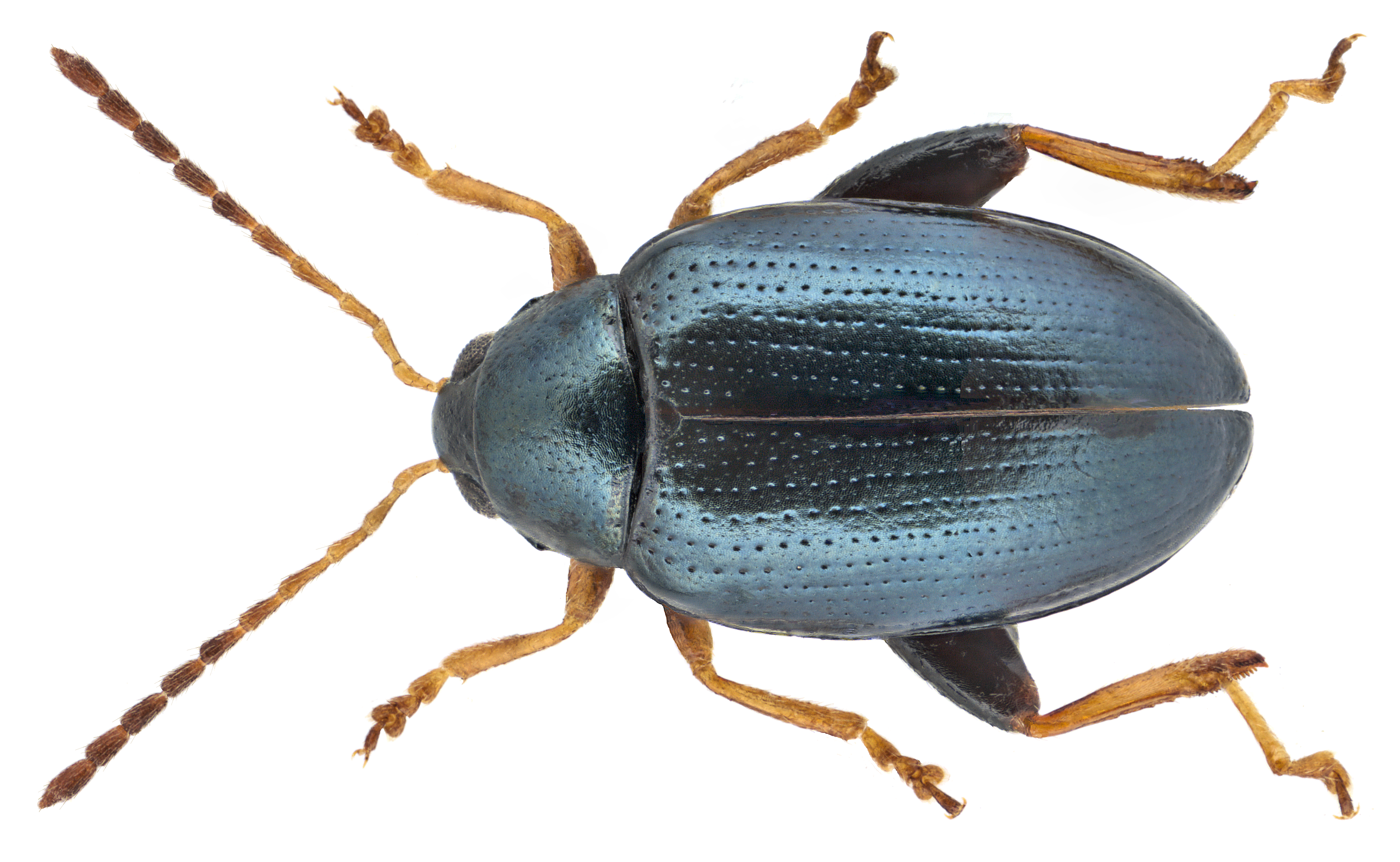

Scientific classification
- Kingdom: Animalia
- Phylum: Arthropoda
- Clade: Pancrustacea
- Class: Insecta
- Order: Coleoptera
- Suborder: Polyphaga
- Infraorder: Cucujiformia
- Family: Chrysomelidae
- Genus: Psylliodes
- Species: P. napi

Binomial name
- Psylliodes napi (Fabricius, 1792)

= Psylliodes napi =

Species of beetle

Psylliodes napi is a species of flea beetle in the family Chrysomelidae. It is found in Europe and Northern Asia (excluding China) and North America.

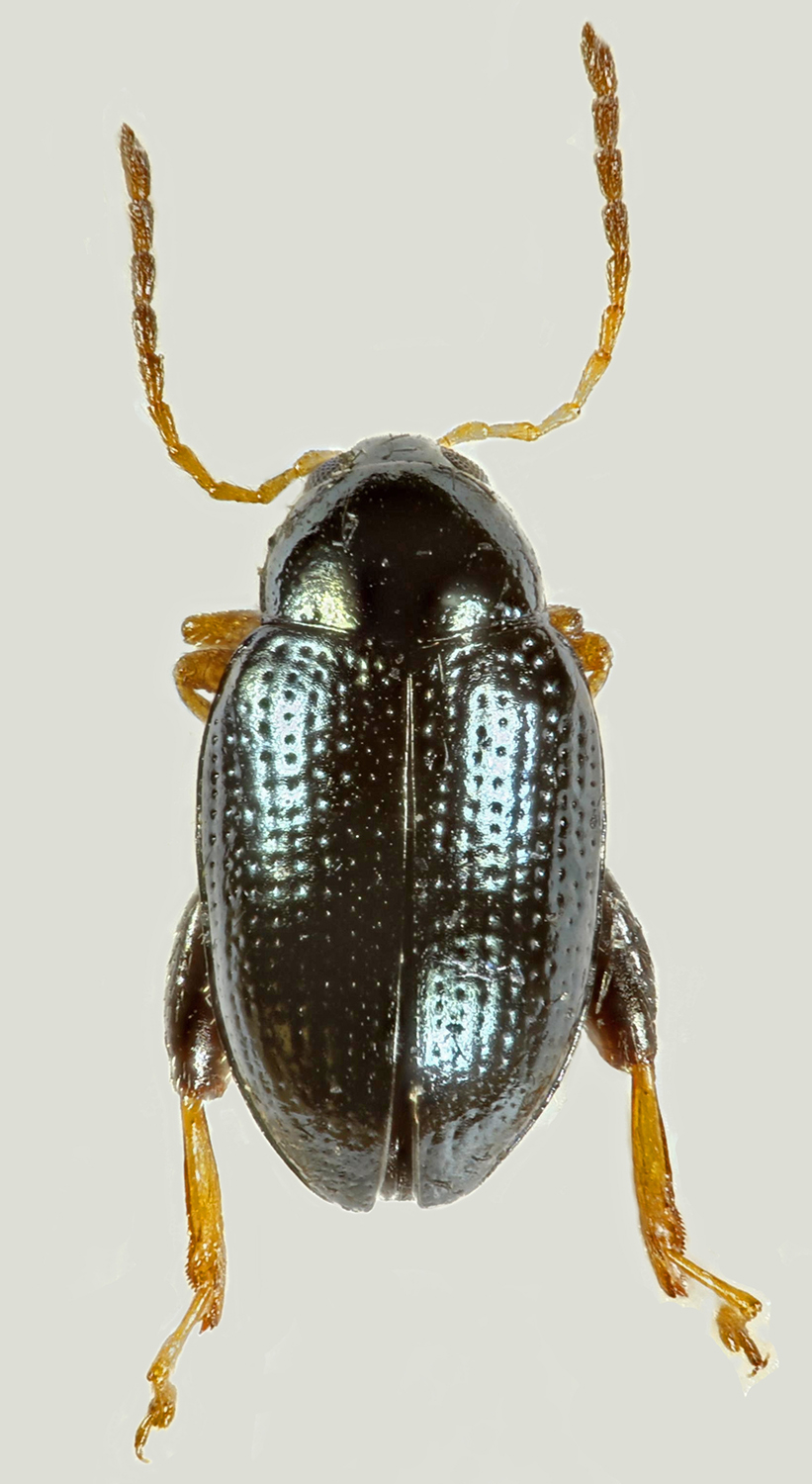

== Subspecies ==
These two subspecies belong to the species Psylliodes napi:

- Psylliodes napi flavicornis (blue Lundy cabbage flea beetle) Weise, 1883
- Psylliodes napi napi (Fabricius, 1792)
