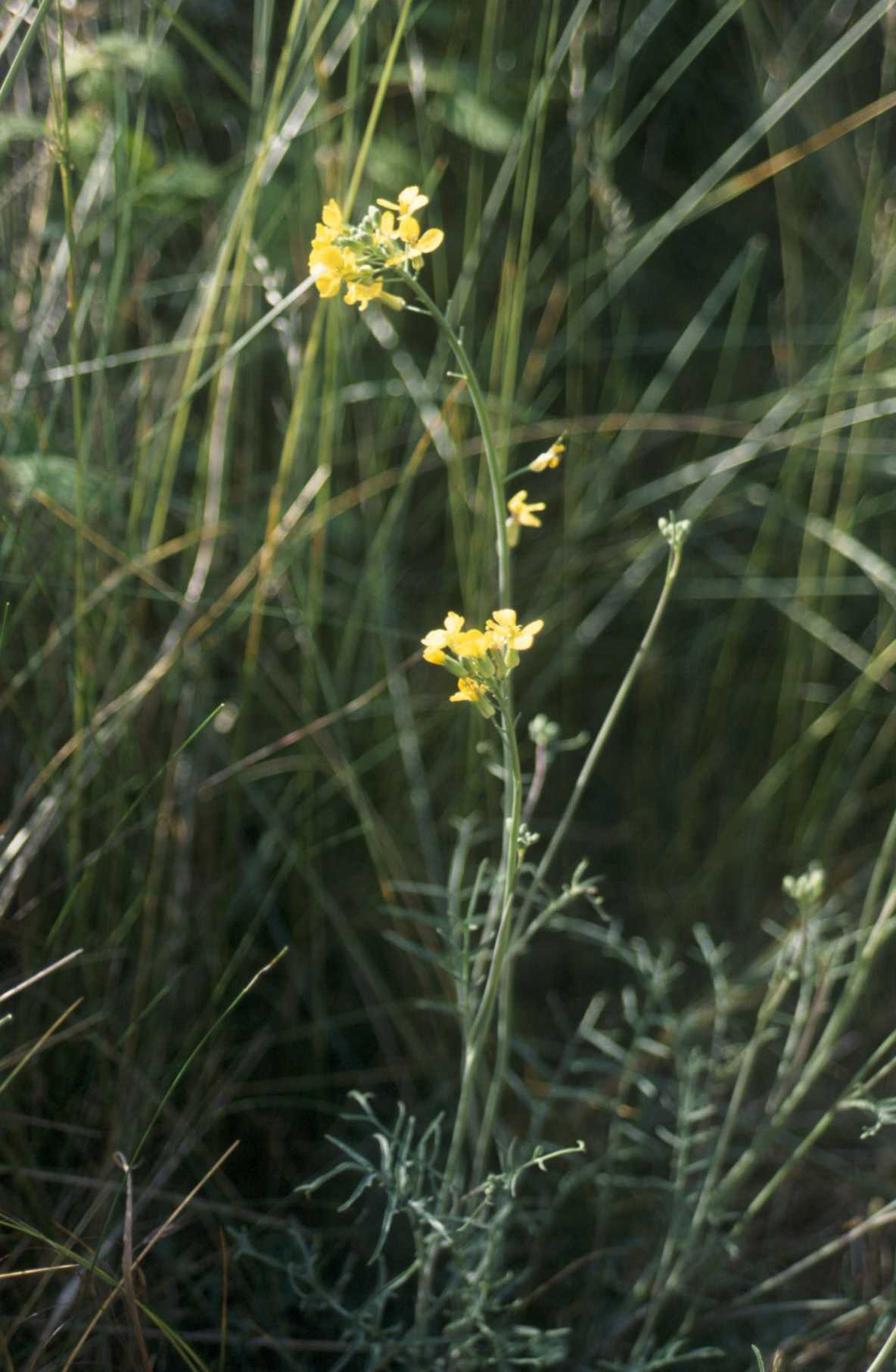
- Coincya monensis subsp. monensis

Scientific classification
- Kingdom: Plantae
- Clade: Tracheophytes
- Clade: Angiosperms
- Clade: Eudicots
- Clade: Rosids
- Order: Brassicales
- Family: Brassicaceae
- Genus: Coincya; Rouy

Synonyms
- Hutera Porta; Brassicella Fourr. ex O.E.Schulz; Rhynchosinapis Hayek

= Coincya =

Genus of flowering plants in the cabbage family Brassicaceae

Coincya is a genus of flowering plant that belongs to the family Brassicaceae. Three species of the plant are endemic to the British Isles, these being Coincya wrightii (Lundy cabbage), Coincya cheiranthos (nokkasinapit) and Coincya monensis, which has two subspecies, C. monensis subsp. monensis (Isle of Man cabbage) and C. monensis subsp. recurvata (star mustard). Another four species are endangered and endemic to the south-central Iberian peninsula.

The name derives from the French botanist Auguste-Henri de Coincy.

The star mustard, a plant introduced to eight U.S. states is the same species as the Isle of Man cabbage but a different subspecies. It may have been introduced to the U.S. as the Isle of Man cabbage and subsequently evolved through the founder effect and geographic isolation into a new subspecies.

== Species ==
7 species are accepted.

- Coincya longirostra (Boiss.) Greuter & Burdet
- Coincya monensis (L.) Greuter & Burdet
  - C. monensis subsp. monensis (Isle of Man cabbage)
  - C. monensis subsp. recurvata (Star mustard)
- Coincya richeri (Vill.) Greuter & Burdet
- Coincya rupestris Porta & Rigo ex Rouy
- Coincya tournefortii (Gouan) Alcaraz, T.E.Díaz, Rivas Mart. & Sánchez-Gómez
- Coincya transtagana (Cout.) Clem.-Muñoz & Hern.-Berm.
- Coincya wrightii (O.E.Schulz) Stace
