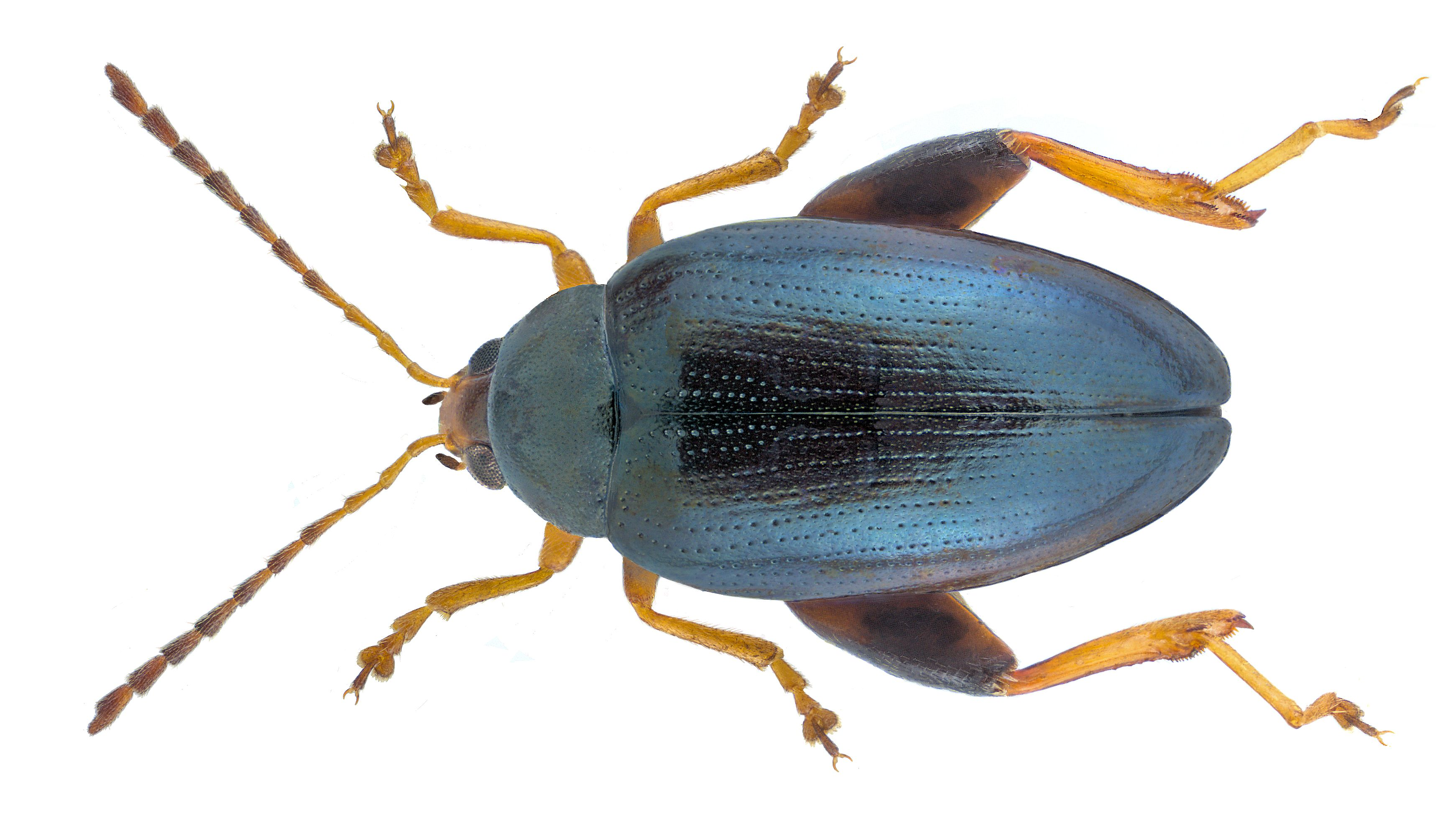

Scientific classification
- Kingdom: Animalia
- Phylum: Arthropoda
- Class: Insecta
- Order: Coleoptera
- Suborder: Polyphaga
- Infraorder: Cucujiformia
- Family: Chrysomelidae
- Genus: Psylliodes
- Species: P. chrysocephala

Binomial name
- Psylliodes chrysocephala Linnaeus, 1758

= Psylliodes chrysocephala =

Species of beetle

Psylliodes chrysocephala or Psylliodes chrysocephalus, commonly known as the cabbage-stem flea beetle, is a species of leaf beetle situated in the subfamily Galerucinae and the tribe Alticini (flea beetles).

== Description ==
P. chrysocephala measures 3.0–4.0 mm in length. It is variably coloured, but most often a dark metallic blue. Like all flea beetles it has large hind femora which it can use to jump. These are orange-red in colour with the hind femora darkened.

It is differentiated from other members of the genus through a lack of anterior angles on its pronotum, the punctures on top of the head being as coarse as those on the elytra, and its first front tarsal segment being equal in length to its third.

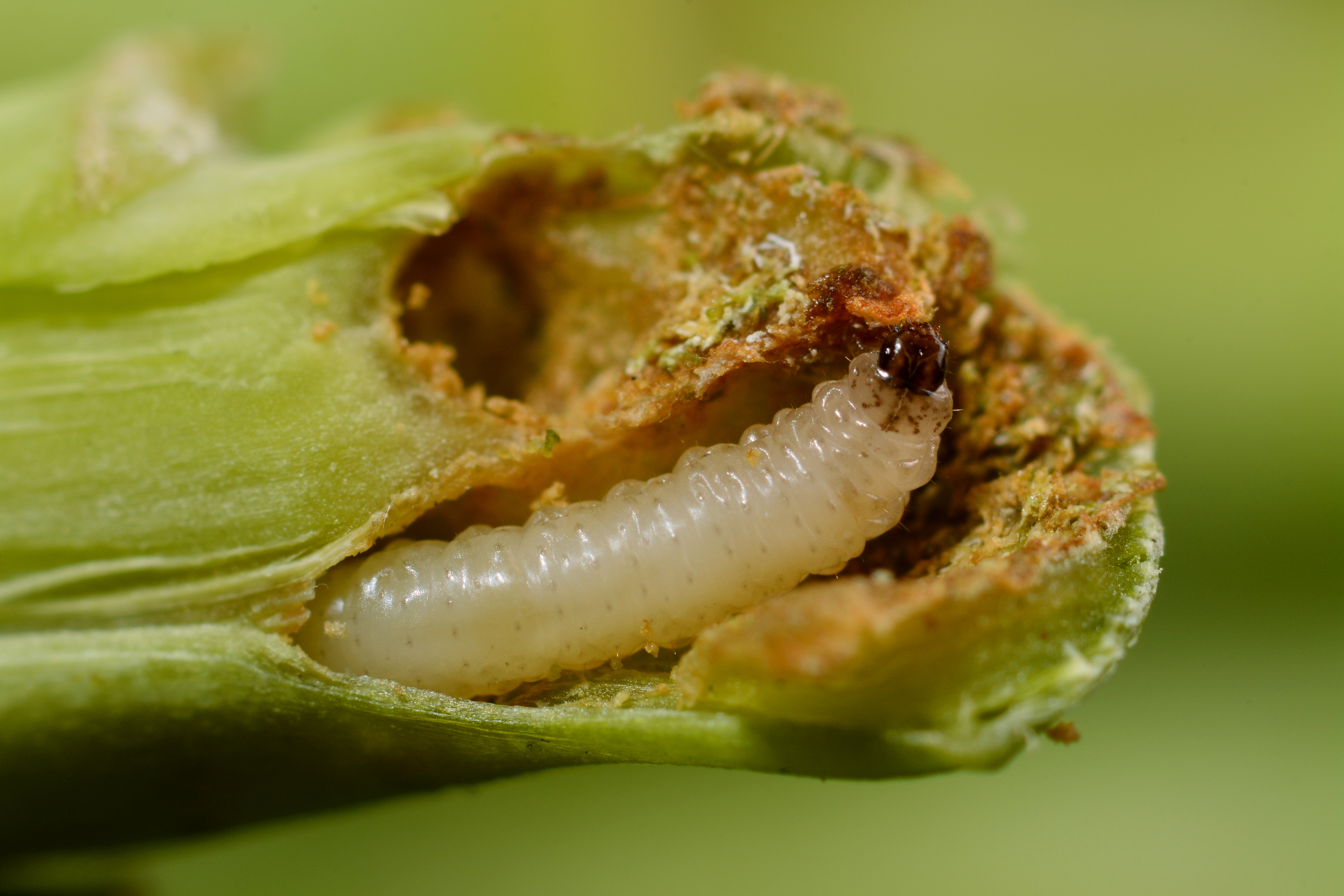
Psylliodes chrysocephala larva feeding in stem of Brassica napus

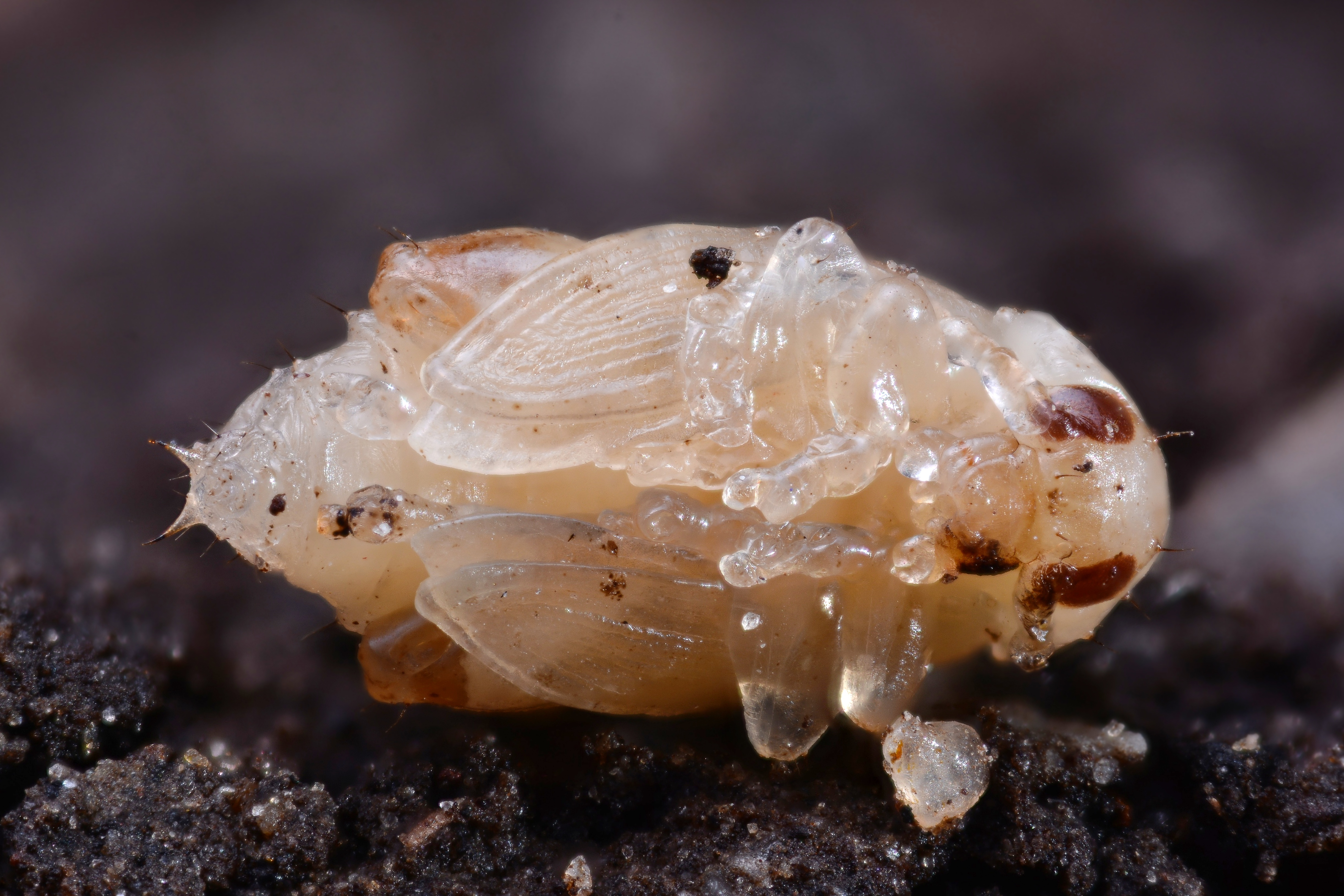
P. chrysocephala pupa

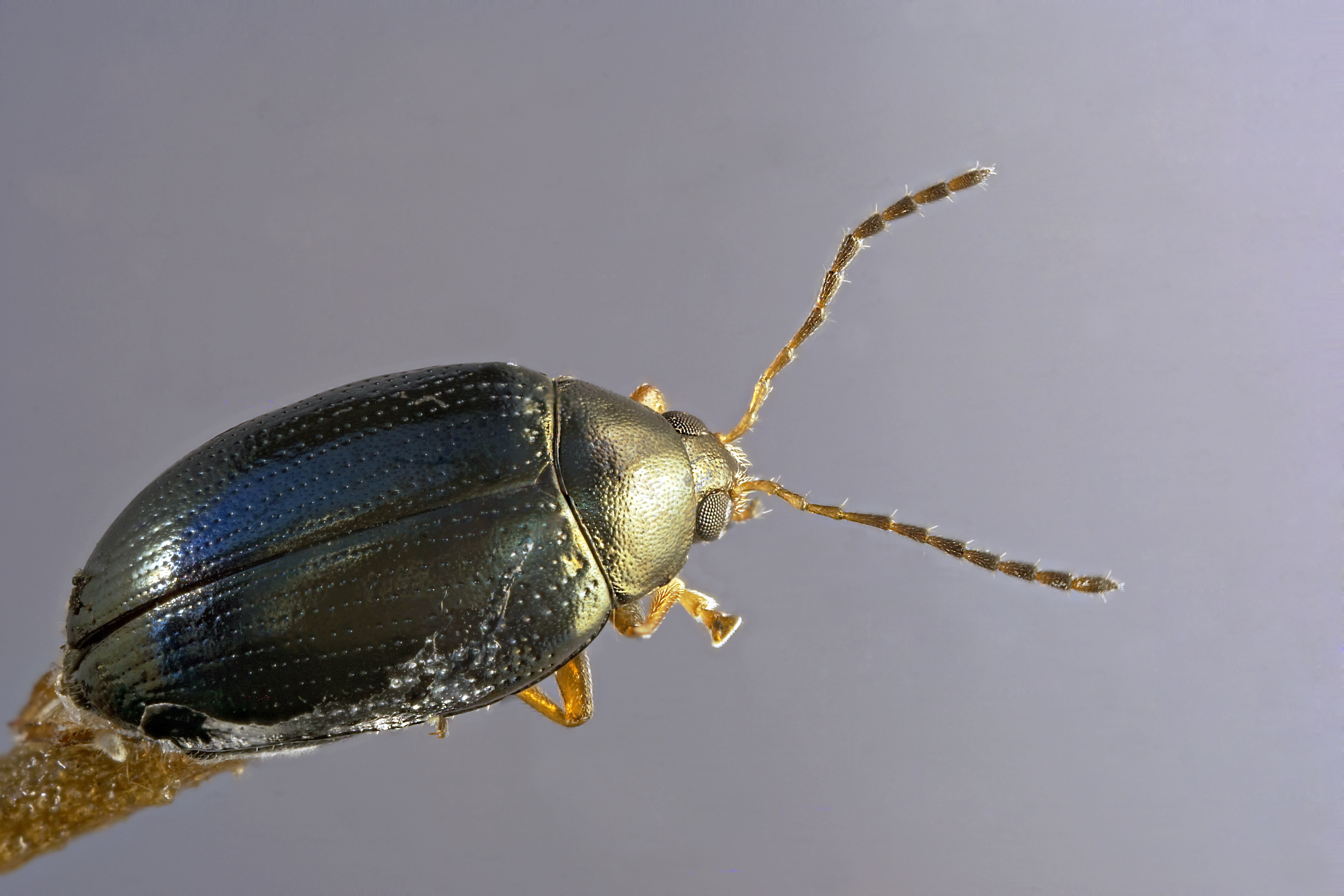
Adult beetle

== Distribution ==
It is native to the Western Palaearctic, including Macaronesia, Cape Verde and North Africa and has been introduced into Canada.

== Lifecycle ==
Adult beetles mate in late August on the leaves of host plants, with eggs first laid 5–10 days after copulation. Oviposition takes place from the end of September through winter until mid-April and a single female may lay up to 1000 eggs, deposited in small clusters in the soil beneath the host plant at depths of 1–5 cm. Larvae hatch after about 60 days and feed within the stem and leaves of the host plant. Fully developed larvae emerge in early summer and pupate in the soil. Newly emerged adults appear from May each year. Adults may enter an aestivation period over Summer after the harvest of mature rape plants. After mating in late summer, some adults will overwinter.

== Behaviour and habitat ==
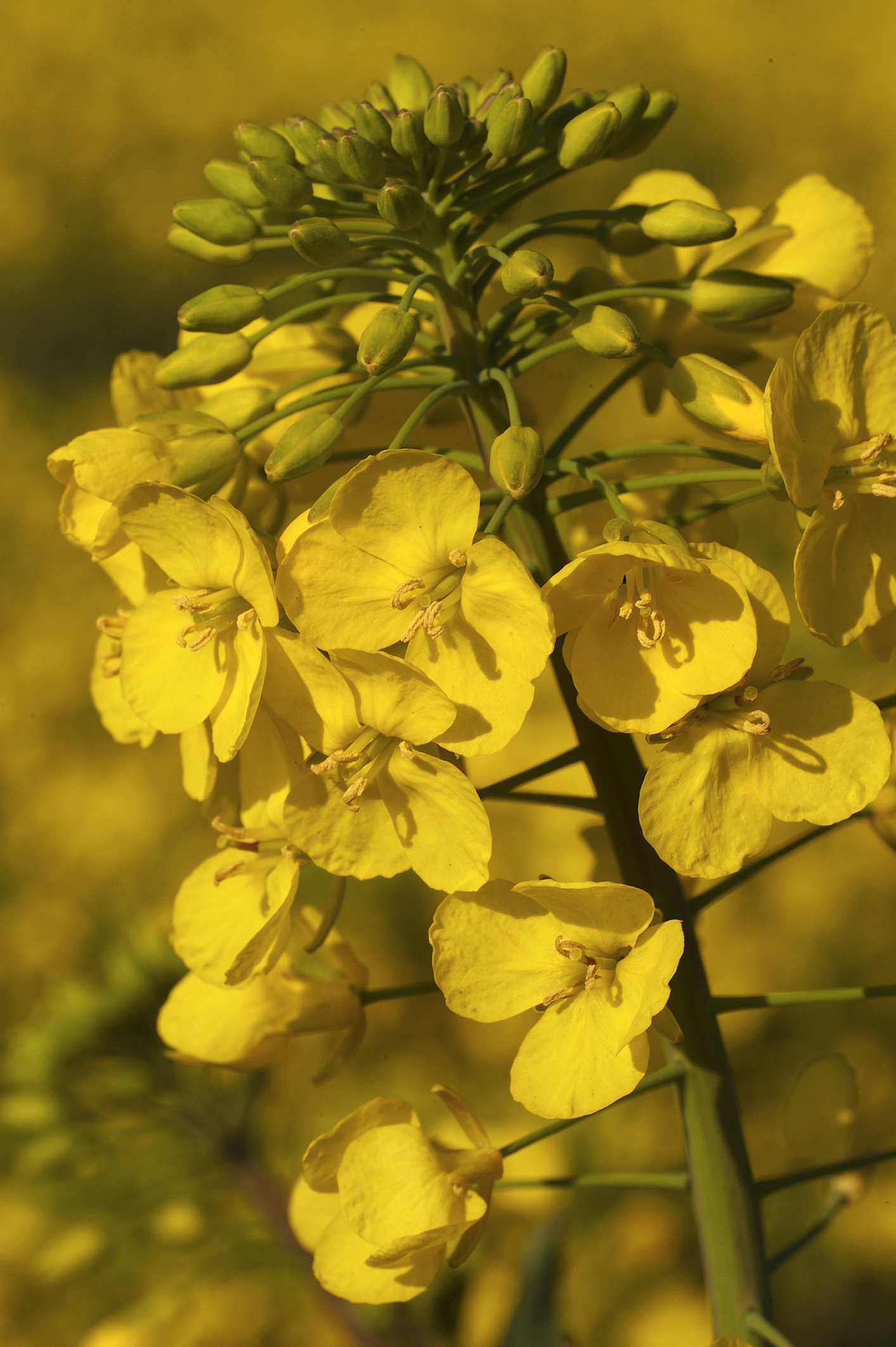
Brassica napus (rape seed)

P. crysocephala can be found in various habitats, depending on the availability of a host plant. It is particularly associated with wild and cultivated members of the plant family Brassicaceae. It has been directly associated with Brassica napus, B. nigra (black mustard), B. oleracea (cabbages, cauliflowers), B. rapa (turnip rape), Nasturtium officinale (watercress), Raphanus sativus (radish), Sinapis alba (white mustard), S. arvensis (wild mustard), and Tropaeolum majus (common nasturtium).

=== As an arable pest ===
It is a serious pest of rape in northern Europe. In central parts of Europe it has a cyclic appearance with peaks in populations at intervals of about seven years. In the UK, it is the most important establishment pest of rape, leading to yield losses of up to 20%.

== Pest control ==
The management of P. chrysocephala has become increasingly difficult due to the ban on neonicotinoids and the rise of pyrethroid-resistant populations. RNA interference (RNAi) has emerged as a promising alternative for pest control due to its species-specific and environmentally friendly nature. Recent research has demonstrated that orally delivered double-stranded RNA (dsRNA) can effectively silence essential genes in P. chrysocephala, leading to significant mortality. A study tested 27 dsRNAs targeting genes identified in a genome-wide RNAi screen in Tribolium castaneum and found four highly effective target genes that caused 100% mortality within 8–13 days. These genes, primarily encoding proteasome subunits, showed strong dose-dependent effects with LD50 values as low as ~20 ng. Additionally, effective dsRNAs reduced feeding damage by up to 75% and affected beetle locomotion. Off-target prediction analysis was performed to design environmentally safe dsRNAs that minimize risks to non-target organisms, such as pollinators. These findings highlight the potential of RNAi-based insecticides as an innovative and sustainable pest management strategy against P. chrysocephala.
