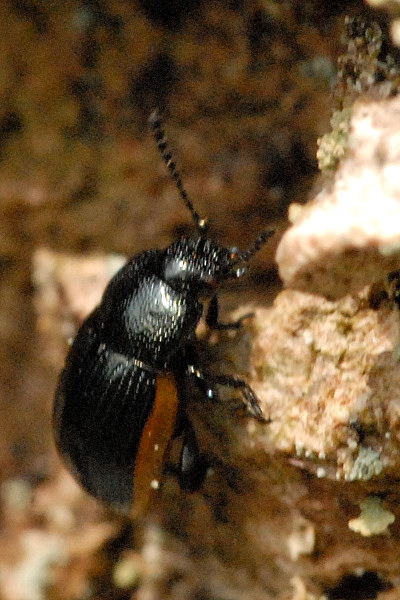

Scientific classification
- Kingdom: Animalia
- Phylum: Arthropoda
- Class: Insecta
- Order: Coleoptera
- Suborder: Polyphaga
- Infraorder: Cucujiformia
- Family: Chrysomelidae
- Genus: Hydrothassa
- Species: H. glabra

Binomial name
- Hydrothassa glabra (Herbst, 1783)

= Hydrothassa glabra =

Species of beetle

Hydrothassa glabra is a Europe species of leaf beetle in the family Chrysomelinae

== Description ==
Hydrothassa glabra grows to 3 - 4mm in length and are dark metallic blue and orange-yellow in colour. The elytra is coloured orange-yellow with lateral margins. It may be confused with H. marginella or H. hannoveriana.

== Habitat ==
H. glabra is a widespread species, It has various host plants, particularly buttercups. Creeping buttercup and meadow buttercup' are especially prevalent as host plants. Adults overwinter in grass tussocks.

== Distribution ==
H. glabra is prevalent in central and northern Europe, with a widespread and scattered distribution in the United Kingdom.
