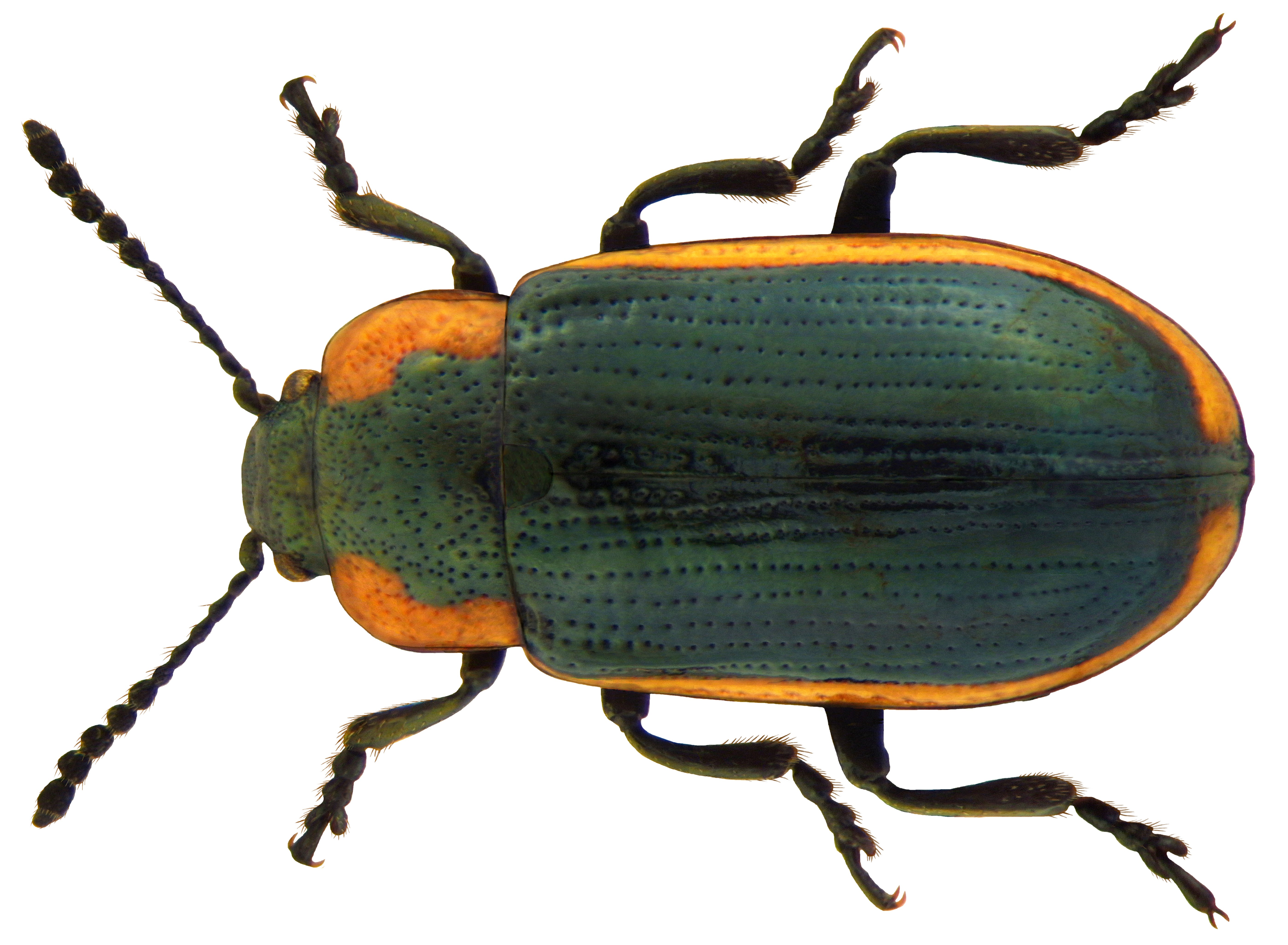

Scientific classification
- Kingdom: Animalia
- Phylum: Arthropoda
- Class: Insecta
- Order: Coleoptera
- Suborder: Polyphaga
- Infraorder: Cucujiformia
- Family: Chrysomelidae
- Genus: Hydrothassa
- Species: H. marginella

Binomial name
- Hydrothassa marginella (Linnaeus, 1758)

= Hydrothassa marginella =

Species of beetle

Hydrothassa marginella is a Europe species of leaf beetles in the family Chrysomelinae

== Description ==
Hydrothassa marginella grows to 3.4 - 4.5mm in length and are dark metallic blue and orange-yellow in colour. The pronotum is coloured yellowish with lateral margins. It may be confused with H. glabra or H. hannoveriana.

== Habitat ==
Hydrothassa marginella is a common and widespread species, active between the months of mid-April and August. It has various host plants, especially buttercups. Adults overwinter in grass tussocks.

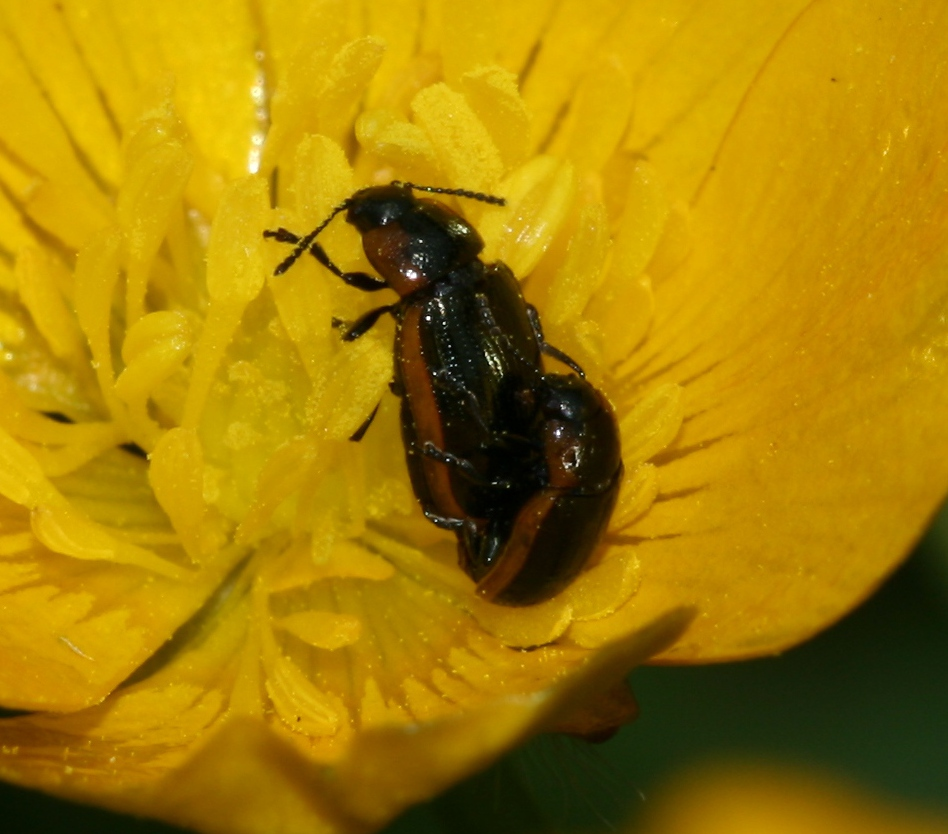
Mating couple of Hydrothassa marginella

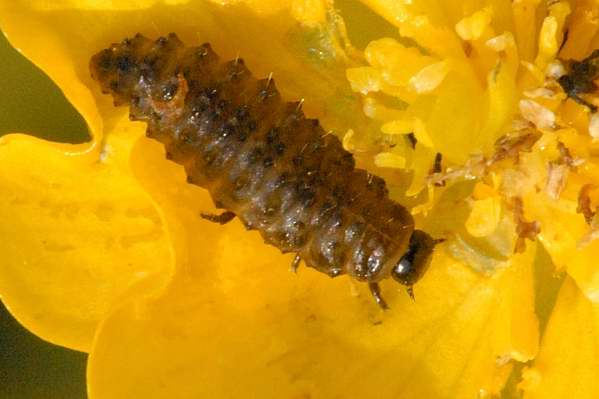
Larva of Hydrothassa marginella

== Distribution ==
Hydrothassa marginella is prevalent in central and northern Europe.
