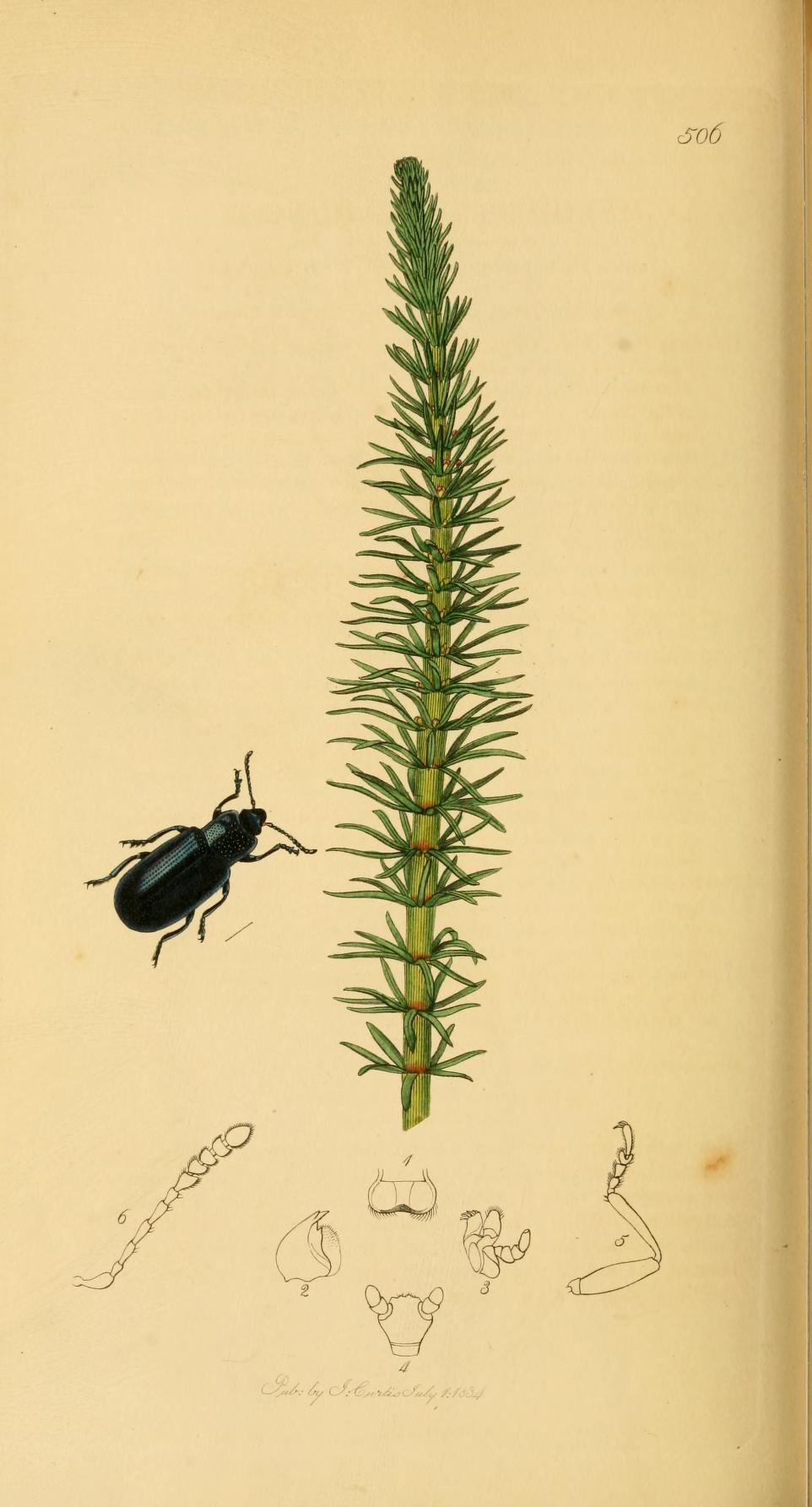

Scientific classification
- Kingdom: Animalia
- Phylum: Arthropoda
- Clade: Pancrustacea
- Class: Insecta
- Order: Coleoptera
- Suborder: Polyphaga
- Infraorder: Cucujiformia
- Family: Chrysomelidae
- Genus: Prasocuris
- Species: P. junci

Binomial name
- Prasocuris junci Brahm, 1790

= Prasocuris junci =

Species of beetle

Prasocuris junci is a species of leaf beetle native to Europe.
