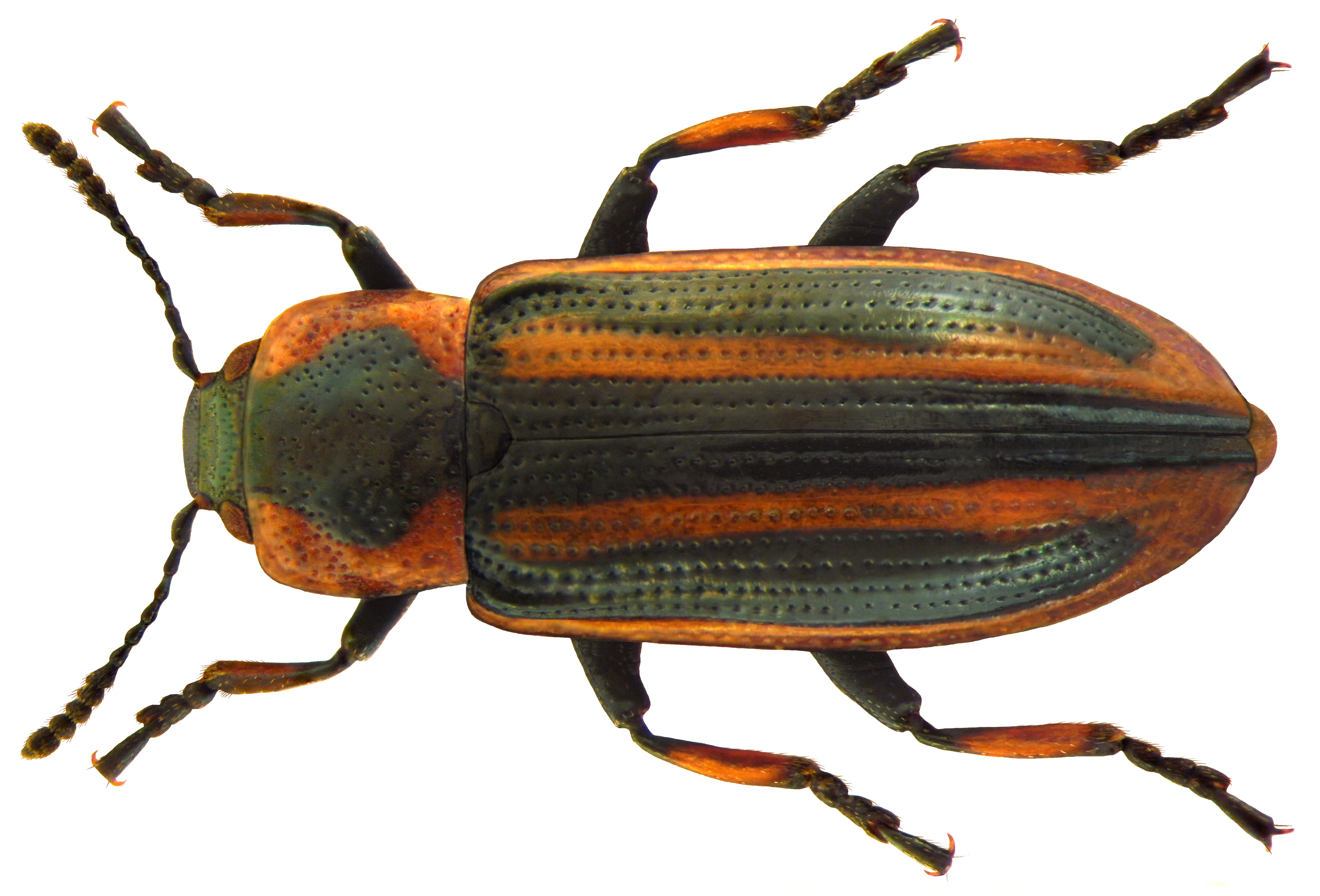
- Prasocuris phellandrii 5-6 mm.

Scientific classification
- Kingdom: Animalia
- Phylum: Arthropoda
- Class: Insecta
- Order: Coleoptera
- Suborder: Polyphaga
- Infraorder: Cucujiformia
- Family: Chrysomelidae
- Genus: Prasocuris
- Species: P. phellandrii

Binomial name
- Prasocuris phellandrii Linnaeus, 1758

= Prasocuris phellandrii =

Species of beetle

Prasocuris phellandrii is a species of beetle in family Chrysomelidae. It is found in the Palearctic.
