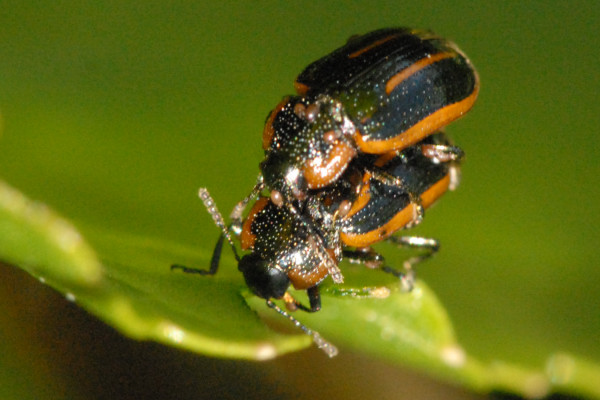

Scientific classification
- Domain: Eukaryota
- Kingdom: Animalia
- Phylum: Arthropoda
- Class: Insecta
- Order: Coleoptera
- Suborder: Polyphaga
- Infraorder: Cucujiformia
- Family: Chrysomelidae
- Genus: Hydrothassa
- Species: H. hannoveriana

Binomial name
- Hydrothassa hannoveriana (Fabricius, 1775)

Synonyms
- Prasocuris hannoveriana (Fabricius, 1775)

= Hydrothassa hannoveriana =

Species of beetle

Hydrothassa hannoveriana is a species of leaf beetle in the family Chrysomelinae. It is found in Europe.

== Description ==
Hydrothassa hannoveriana grows to 3.5 - 5.0mm in length and are dark metallic blue and orange-yellow or reddish in colour. The elytra are coloured yellowish in median longitudinal strips. These elytral marks may fuse, especially at the rear in females; the median stripe may also be broken or absent. The species may be confused with H. glabra or H. marginella.

== Habitat ==
It has various host plants, especially buttercups and marsh-marigolds.

== Distribution ==
H. hannoveriana have a scattered distribution in central and northern Europe. In the United Kingdom it is designated as 'Nationally Scarce' and categorised by the IUCN criteria "vulnerable".
