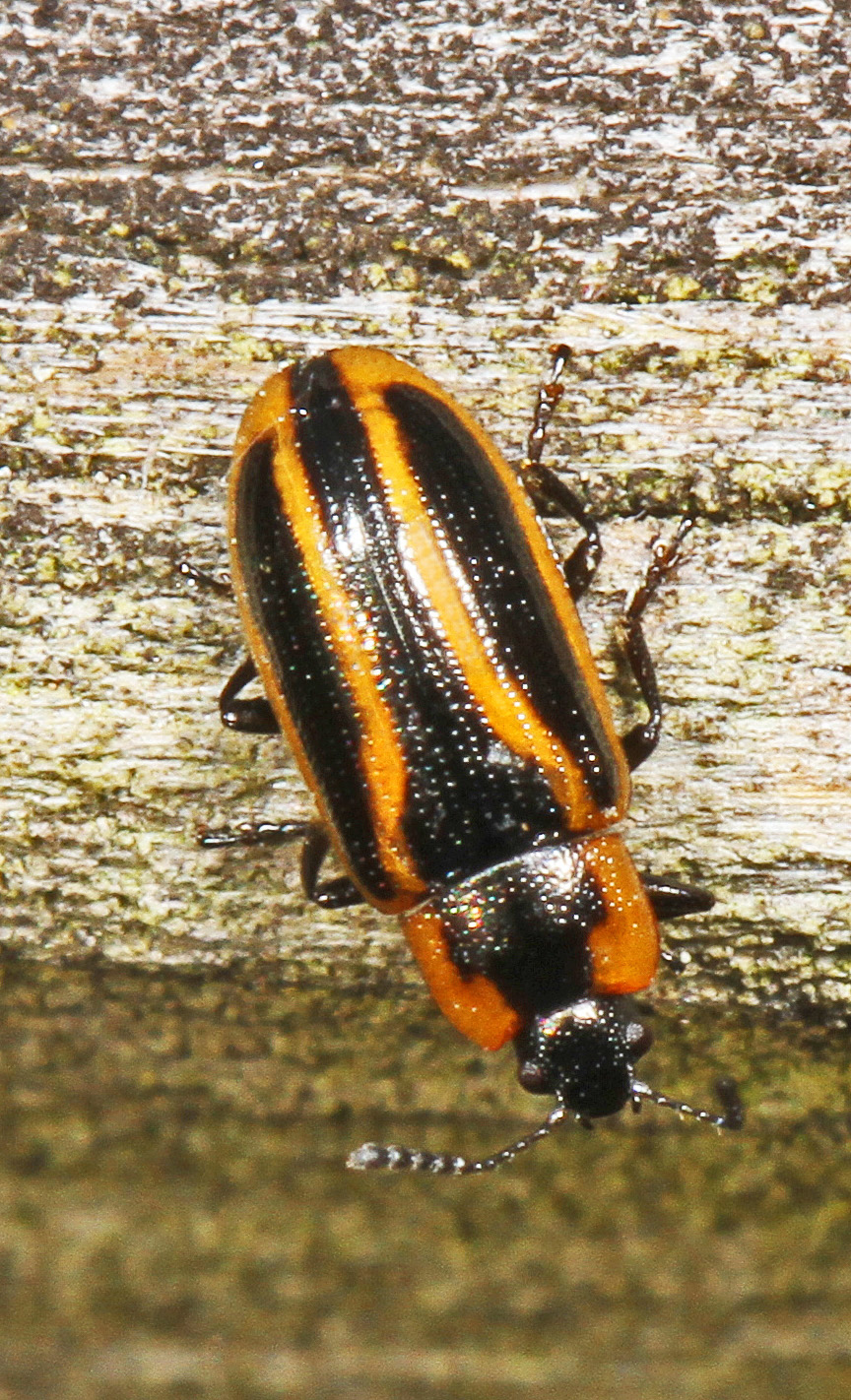
- Prasocuris vittata

Scientific classification
- Domain: Eukaryota
- Kingdom: Animalia
- Phylum: Arthropoda
- Class: Insecta
- Order: Coleoptera
- Suborder: Polyphaga
- Infraorder: Cucujiformia
- Family: Chrysomelidae
- Subfamily: Chrysomelinae
- Tribe: Chrysomelini
- Genus: Prasocuris; Latreille, 1802

= Prasocuris =

Genus of beetles

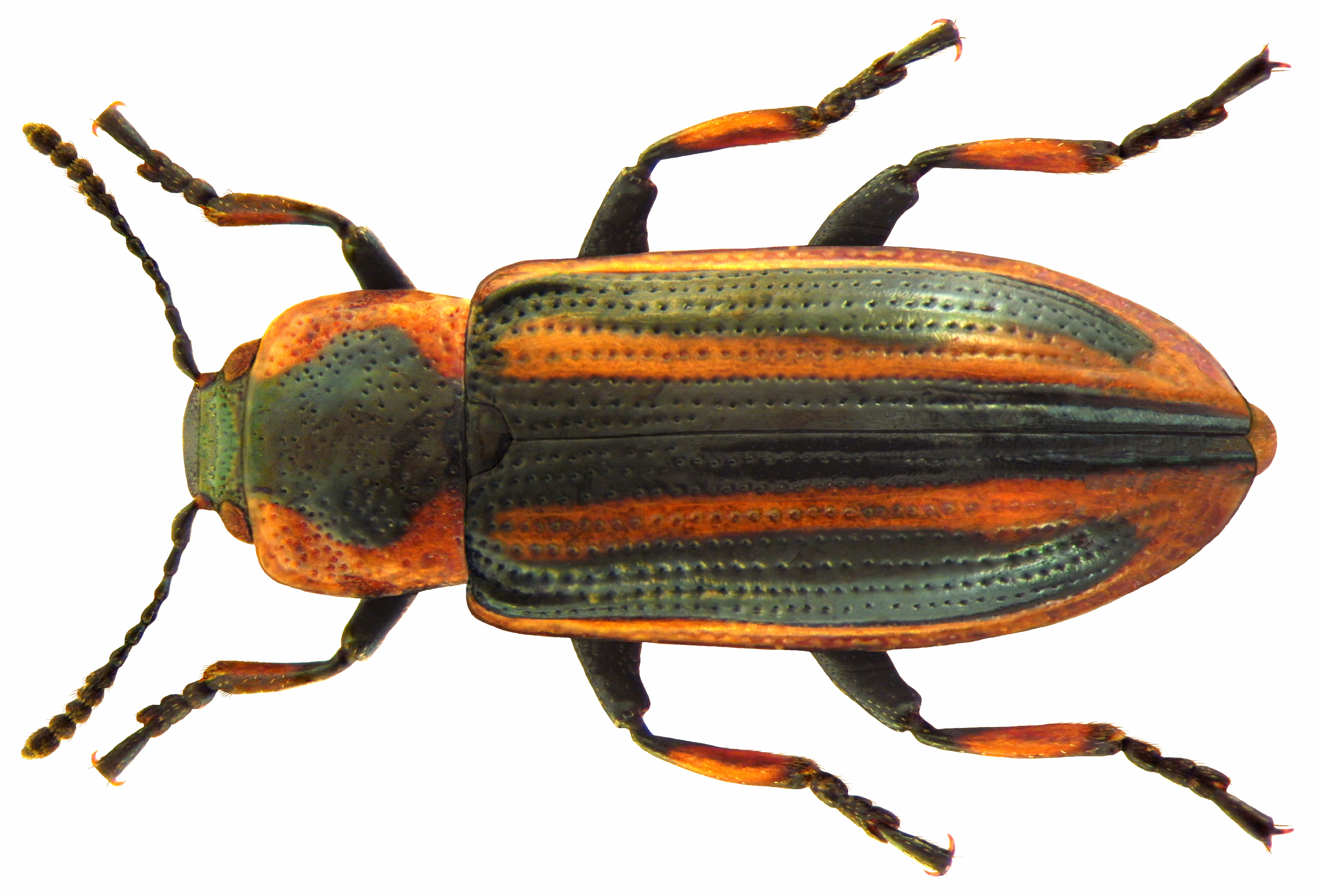
Prasocuris phellandrii (Linnaeus 1758)

Prasocuris is a genus of Chrysomelinae (a subfamily of leaf beetles).

== Species ==
These species belong to the genus Prasocuris:

- Subgenus Hydrothassa Thomson, 1859 (sometimes treated as a separate genus, Hydrothassa)
  - Prasocuris boreella (Schaeffer, 1928)
  - Prasocuris obliquata J. L. LeConte, 1866
  - Prasocuris ovalis Blatchley, 1910
  - Prasocuris vittata (Olivier, 1807)
- Subgenus Prasocuris Latreille, 1802
  - Prasocuris junci Brahm, 1790
  - Prasocuris phellandrii (Linnaeus, 1758)
