= Prasocuris boreella =

Scientific classification
- Domain: Eukaryota
- Kingdom: Animalia
- Phylum: Arthropoda
- Class: Insecta
- Order: Coleoptera
- Suborder: Polyphaga
- Infraorder: Cucujiformia
- Family: Chrysomelidae
- Genus: Prasocuris
- Species: P. boreella

Binomial name
- Prasocuris boreella (Schaeffer, 1928)

Synonyms
- Hydrothassa boreela Schaeffer, 1928

Species of beetle

Prasocuris boreella is a species of leaf beetle in the family Chrysomelidae. It is found in North America.
