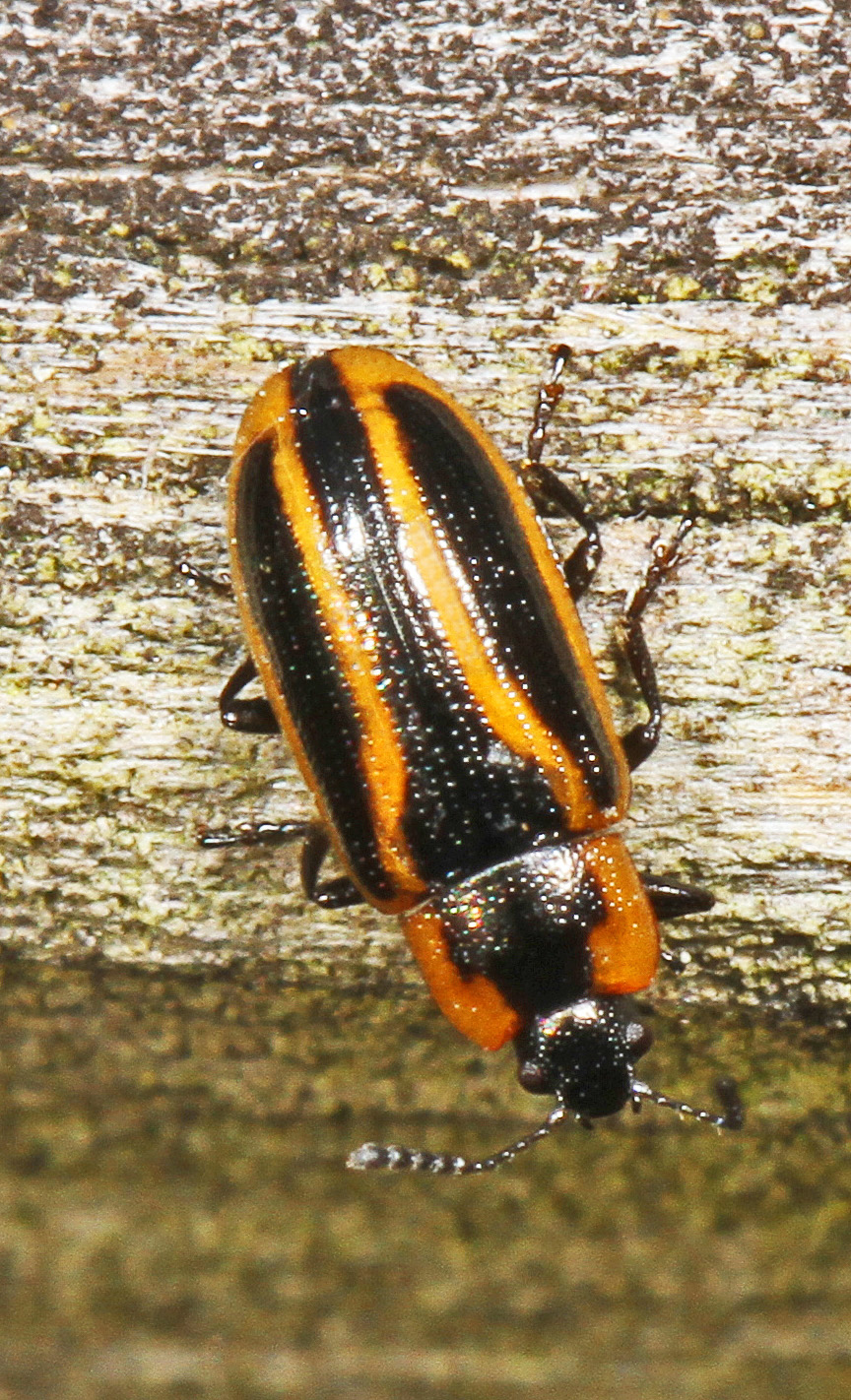

Scientific classification
- Domain: Eukaryota
- Kingdom: Animalia
- Phylum: Arthropoda
- Class: Insecta
- Order: Coleoptera
- Suborder: Polyphaga
- Infraorder: Cucujiformia
- Family: Chrysomelidae
- Genus: Prasocuris
- Species: P. vittata

Binomial name
- Prasocuris vittata (Olivier, 1807)

= Prasocuris vittata =

Species of beetle

Prasocuris vittata is a species of leaf beetles in the family Chrysomelidae. It is found in North America.
