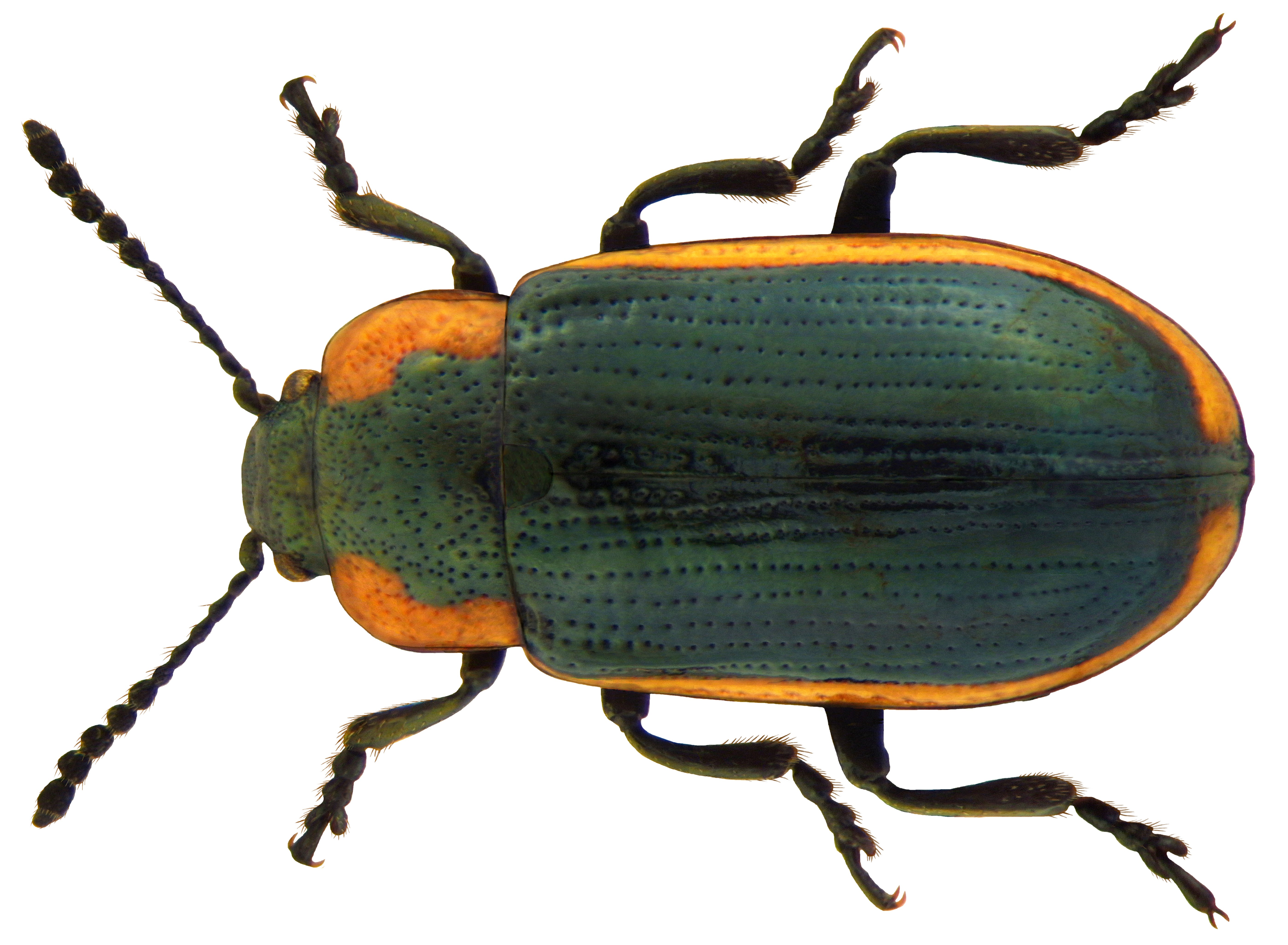
- Hydrothassa marginella (Linnaeus, 1758)

Scientific classification
- Domain: Eukaryota
- Kingdom: Animalia
- Phylum: Arthropoda
- Class: Insecta
- Order: Coleoptera
- Suborder: Polyphaga
- Infraorder: Cucujiformia
- Family: Chrysomelidae
- Subfamily: Chrysomelinae
- Genus: Hydrothassa; Thomson, 1859

= Hydrothassa =

Genus of beetles

Hydrothassa is a genus of Chrysomelinae (a subfamily of leaf beetles). It is sometimes treated as a subgenus of Prasocuris.

== Species ==
- H. fairmairei (Brisout de Bameville, 1866)
- H. flavocincta (Brulle, 1832)
- H. glabra (Herbst, 1783)
- H. hannoveriana (Fabricius, 1775)
- H. marginella (Linnaeus, 1758)
- H. oblongiuscula (Fairmaire, 1884)
- H. suffriani (Küster, 1852)

== Gallery ==
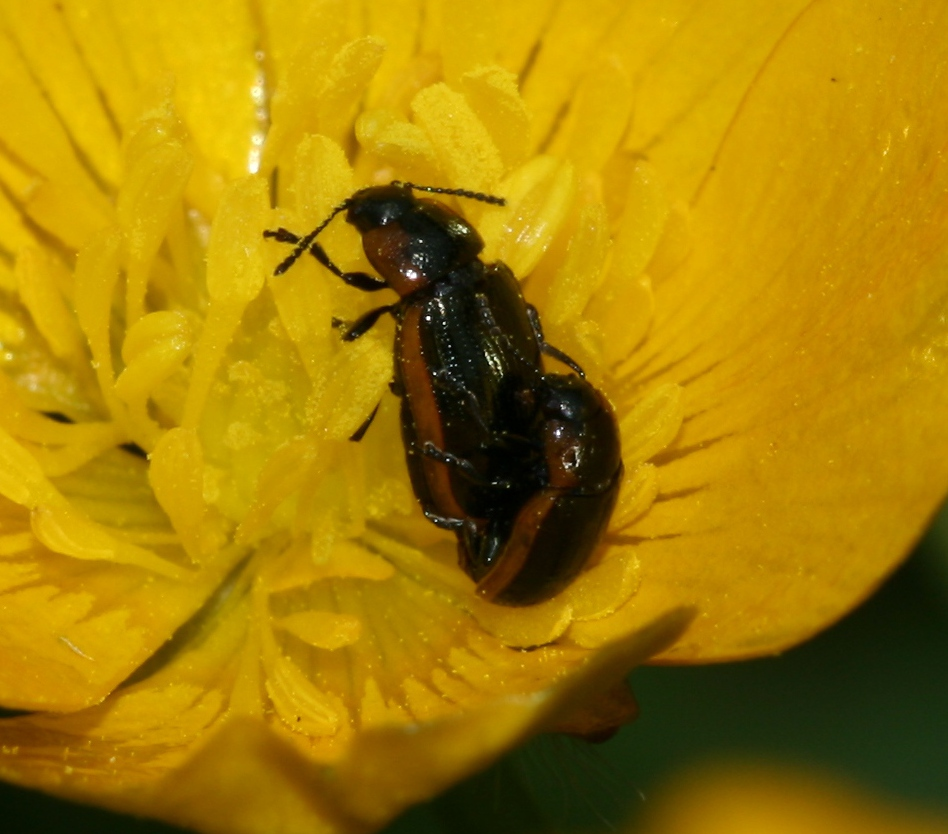
Hydrothassa marginella

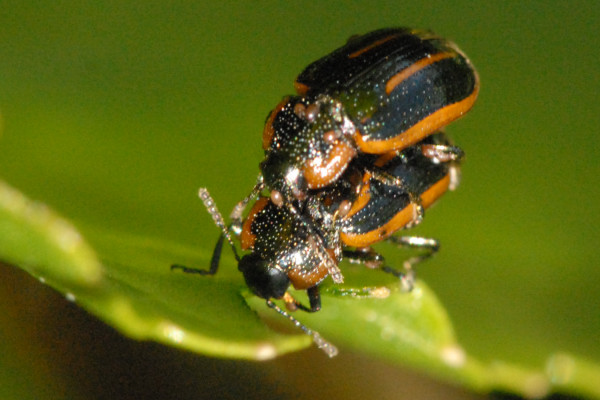
Hydrothassa hannoveriana
