= List of flea beetle genera =

The flea beetles, or Alticini, make up the largest tribe within the leaf beetle family (Chrysomelidae), comprising over 500 genera and approximately 8000 described species distributed worldwide.

== A ==
- Abrarius Fairmaire, 1902
- Acallepitrix Bechyné, 1959
- Acanthonycha Jacoby, 1891
- Acrocrypta Baly, 1862
- Acrocyum Jacoby, 1885
- Adamastoraltica Biondi, Iannella & D'Alessandro, 2020
- Aedmon Clark, 1860
- Aemulaphthona Scherer, 1969
- Aeschrocnemis Weise, 1888
- Afroaltica Biondi & D'Alessandro, 2007
- Afrocrepis Bechyné, 1954
- Afrorestia Bechyné, 1959
- Agasicles Jacoby, 1905
- Alagoasa Bechyné, 1955
- Alasia Furth & Zhaurova, 2010
- Alema Sharp, 1876
- Allenaltica Prathapan, Ruan & Konstantinov, 2017
- Allochroma Clark, 1860
- Alocypha Weise, 1911
- Altica Geoffroy, 1762 (= Neoclitena Abdullah & Qureshi, 1968)
- Alytus Jacoby, 1887
- †Ambraaltica Bukejs & Konstantinov, 2013
- Amphimela Chapuis, 1875
- Analema Samuelson, 1973
- Anaxerta Fairmaire, 1902
- Andersonaltica Linzmeier & Konstantinov, 2012
- Andersonoplatus Linzmeier & Konstantinov, 2018
- Andiroba Bechyné & Bechyné, 1965
- Anelytropleurica Bechyné & Bechyné, 1964
- Anerapa Scherer, 1962
- Angulaphthona Bechyné, 1960
- Antanemora Bechyné, 1964
- Anthobiodes Weise, 1887
- Apalotrius Clark, 1860
- Aphanocera Jacoby, 1884
- Aphthona Chevrolat, 1836
- Aphthonaltica Heikertinger, 1924
- Aphthonella Jacoby, 1889
- Aphthonoides Jacoby, 1885
- Apleuraltica Bechyné, 1956
- Apraea Baly, 1877
- Apteraltica Medvedev, 2004
- Apteropeda Chevrolat, 1836
- Araguaenia Bechyné, 1968
- Araoua Bechyné, 1955
- †Archealtica Nadein, 2015
- Archilactica Bechyné & Bechyné, 1975
- Argopistes Motschulsky, 1860
- Argopistoides Jacoby, 1892 (= Torodera Weise, 1902)
- Argopus Fischer von Waldheim, 1824
- Argusonychis Konstantinov, Van Roie & Furth, 2022
- Arrhenocoela Foudras, 1861
- Arsipoda Erichson, 1842
- Asiophrida Medvedev, 1999
- Asphaera Duponchel & Chevrolat, 1842
- Asphaerina Bechyné, 1963
- Asutosha Maulik, 1926
- Atyphus Clark, 1860
- Aulacothorax Boheman, 1858 (Note: In the phylogenetic study of Douglas et al. (2023), Aulacothorax is removed from Alticini and instead placed in its own tribe, Serraticollini.)
- Aulonodera Champion, 1918
- Axillofebra Samuelson, 1969
- Ayalaia Bechyné & Bechyné, 1960

== B ==
- Babiohaltica Bechyné, 1955
- Balimistika Dawood & Takizawa, 2013
- Balzanica Bechyné, 1959
- Bangalaltica Bechyné, 1960
- Baoshanaltica Ruan & Konstantinov in Ruan et al., 2017
- Batophila Foudras, 1860
- Bechuana Scherer, 1970
- Bechynella Biondi & D'Alessandro, 2010
- Bellacincta Scherer, 1962
- Bellaltica Reid, 1988
- Benedictus Scherer, 1969
- Benficana Bechyné & Bechyné, 1961
- Bezdekaltica Döberl, 2012
- Bhamoina Bechyné, 1958
- Bikasha Maulik, 1931
- Bimala Maulik, 1926
- Biodontocnema Biondi, 2000
- Blakealtica Viswajyothi & Konstantinov, 2020
- Blepharida Chevrolat, 1836
- Blepharidina Bechyné, 1968
- Bonfilsus Scherer, 1967
- Borbaita Bechyné, 1957
- Borinken Konstantinov & Konstantinova, 2011
- Borneocycla Medvedev, 2007
- Brachyscelis Germar, 1934
- Brasilaphthona Bechyné, 1956
- Bubiscus Savini, Furth & Joly, 2009
- Burumoseria Csiki, 1939 (formerly Moseria Weise, 1922)

== C ==
- Cacoscelis Chevrolat, 1836
- Caeporis Clark, 1865
- Calipeges Clark, 1860
- Callangaltica Bechyné, 1958
- Calliphron Jacoby, 1891
- Caloscelis Clark, 1865
- Calotheca Heyden, 1887
- †Cambaltica Nadein, 2019
- Cangshanaltica Konstantinov, Chamorro, Prathapan, Ge & Yang, 2013
- Capraita Bechyné, 1957
- Carcharodis Weise, 1910
- Carecuruna Bechyné & Bechyné, 1965
- Carminaltica Bechyné & Bechyné, 1961
- Celisaltica Biondi, 2001
- Centralaphthona Bechyné, 1960
- Cerichrestus Clark, 1860
- Cerotrus Jacoby, 1884
- Chabria Jacoby, 1887
- Chaetocnema Stephens, 1831
- Chaillucola Bechyné, 1968
- Chalaenaria Medvedev, 2003
- Chalaenosoma Jacoby, 1893 (Note: In the phylogenetic study of Douglas et al. (2023), this genus is formally transferred from Alticini to Galerucini incertae sedis.)
- Chalatenanganya Bechyné & Bechyné, 1963
- Chaloenus Westwood, 1862
- Chanealtica Konstantinov, 2016
- Chaparena Bechyné, 1959
- Chilocoristes Weise, 1895
- Chirodica Germar, 1834
- Chlamophora Chevrolat, 1836
- Chorodecta Harold, 1875
- Chrysogramma Jacoby, 1885
- Chrysomila Savini, Escalona & Furth, 2008
- Ciguapanychis Konstantinov, Van Roie & Furth, 2022
- Clavicornaltica Scherer, 1974
- Cleonica Jacoby, 1887
- Cleophes Jacoby, 1886
- Clitea Baly, 1877
- Collartaltica Bechyné, 1959
- Conococha Bechyné, 1958
- Cornulactica Bechyné, 1955
- Coroicona Bechyné, 1956
- Corynothona Bechyné, 1956
- Crepichaeta Medvedev, 1993
- Crepicnema Scherer, 1969
- †Crepidocnema Moseyko, Kirejtshuk & Nel, 2010
- Crepidodera Chevrolat, 1836
- Crepidoderoides Chûjô, 1942
- Crepidosoma Chen, 1939
- Crimissa Stal, 1858
- Cuyabasa Bechyné, 1959
- Cyrsylus Jacoby, 1891

== D ==
- †Davidaltica Nadein, 2019
- Decaria Weise, 1895
- Deciplatus Linzmeier & Konstantinov, 2009
- Demarchus Jacoby, 1887
- Dentilabra Medvedev, 2009
- Derocrepis Weise, 1886
- Deuteraltica Bechyné, 1960
- Diacacoscelis Bechyné, 1968
- Diamphidia Gerstaecker, 1855
- Dibolia Latreille, 1829
- Dimonikaea Bechyné, 1968
- Dinaltica Bechyné, 1956
- Diosyphraea Bechyné, 1959
- Diphaltica Barber, 1941
- Diphaulaca Chevrolat, 1836
- Diphaulacosoma Jacoby, 1892
- Discotarsa Medvedev, 1993
- Disonycha Chevrolat, 1836
- Disonychodes Bechyné, 1955
- Distigmoptera Blake, 1943
- Djallonia Bechyné, 1955
- Docema Waterhouse, 1877
- Docemina Champion, 1918
- Dodericrepa Bechyné, 1951
- Doeberlnotus Prathapan, Ruan & Konstantinov, 2017
- Doloresa Bechyné, 1955
- Drakensbergianella Biondi & D'Alessandro, 2003
- Dunbrodya Jacoby, 1906
- Dysphenges Horn, 1894

== E ==
- Egleraltica Bechyné & Bechyné, 1965
- Elithia Chapuis, 1875
- Elytropachys Motschulsky, 1866
- Enneomacra Bechyné & Bechyné, 1961
- Epitrix Foudras, 1860
- Erinaceialtica Konstantinov & Linzmeier, 2020
- Eriotica Harold, 1877
- Erystana Medvedev, 2010
- Erystus Jacoby, 1885
- Etapocanga Duckett, 1994
- Eudolia Jacoby, 1885
- Eudoliamorpha Scherer, 1989
- Eudoliomima Medvedev, 2004
- Eugoniola Csiki, 1940
- Eupeges Clark, 1860
- Euphenges Clark, 1860
- Euphitrea Baly, 1875
- Euplatysphaera Özdikmen, 2008 (formerly Platysphaera Medvedev, 2001, also known as Platysphaerina Medvedev, 2009)
- Euplectroscelis Crotch, 1873
- Eurylegna Weise, 1910
- Eutornus Clark, 1860
- Eutrea Baly, 1875
- Exartematopus Clark, 1860
- Exaudita Bechyné, 1955
- Exoceras Jacoby, 1891

== F ==
- Febra Clark, 1864
- Forsterita Bechyné, 1959
- Furthia Medvedev, 1999

== G ==
- Gabonia Jacoby, 1893
- Gansuapteris Ruan & Konstantinov in Ruan et al., 2017
- Genaphthona Bechyné, 1956
- Gethosynus Clark, 1860
- Gioia Bechyné, 1955 (= Sidfaya Blake, 1964)
- Glaucosphaera Maulik, 1926
- Glenidion Clark, 1860
- Glyptina LeConte, 1859
- Goniosystena Bechyné, 1997
- Gopala Maulik, 1926
- Goweria Lea, 1926
- Grammicopterus Blanchard, 1851
- †Groehnaltica Bukejs, Reid & Biondi, 2020
- Guadeloupena Bechyné, 1956
- Guilelmia Weise, 1924
- Guinerestia Scherer, 1959

== H ==
- Haemaltica Chen, 1933
- Halticorcus Lea, 1917
- Halticotropis Fairmaire, 1886
- Heikertingerella Csiki, 1940
- Heikertingeria Csiki, 1940
- Hemiglyptus Horn, 1889
- Hemilactica Blake, 1937
- Hemiphrynus Horn, 1889
- Hemipyxis Dejean, 1836
- Hemipyxoides Döberl, 2007
- Hermaeophaga Foudras, 1860
- Hermenegilda Bechyné, 1958
- Hespera Weise, 1889
- Hesperella Medvedev, 1995
- Hesperoides Biondi, 2017
- Heyrovskya Madar & Madar, 1968
- Hildenbrandtina Weise, 1910
- Hippuriphila Foudras, 1861
- Hirtasphaera Medvedev, 2004
- Hirtiaphthona Kimoto, 2000
- Homelea Jacoby, 1884
- Homichloda Weise, 1902
- Homoschema Blake, 1950
- Homotyphus Clark, 1860
- Hornaltica Barber, 1941
- Huarinillasa Bechyné, 1959
- Hydmosyne Clark, 1860
- Hylodromus Clark, 1860
- Hypantherus Clark, 1860
- Hyphaltica Blackburn, 1896
- Hyphalticoda Oke, 1932
- Hyphasis Harold, 1877
- Hypolampsis Clark, 1860

== I ==
- Idaltica Bechyné, 1955
- Iphitrea Baly, 1864
- Iphitroides Jacoby, 1891
- Iphitromela Bechyné, 1997
- Iphitroxena Bechyné, 1997
- Itapiranga Bechyné, 1956
- Ivalia Jacoby, 1887

== J ==
- Jacobyana Maulik, 1926
- Jobia Kirsch, 1877

== K ==
- Kamala Maulik, 1926
- Kanonga Bechyné, 1960
- Kashmirobia Konstantinov & Prathapan, 2006
- Kenialtica Bechyné, 1960
- Kimongona Bechyné, 1959
- Kiskeya Konstantinov & Chamorro-Lacayo, 2006
- Kuschelina Bechyné, 1951

== L ==
- Laboissierea Pic, 1927
- Laboissierella Chen, 1933
- Lacpatica Bechyné & Bechyné, 1977
- Lacpaticoides Bechyné & Bechyné, 1960
- Lactina Harold, 1875
- Lampedona Weise, 1907
- Lanka Maulik, 1926 (= Neorthella Medvedev, 2010)
- Laosaltica Chen, 1961 (= Laosia Chen, 1934)
- Laotzeus Chen, 1933
- Laselva Furth, 2007
- Lepialtica Scherer, 1962
- Leptodibolia Chen, 1941
- Leptophysa Baly, 1887
- Lesneana Chen, 1933
- Letzuella Chen, 1933
- Linaltica Samuelson, 1973
- Lipromela Chen, 1933
- Lipromima Heikertinger, 1924
- Lipromorpha Chûjô & Kimoto, 1960
- Liprus Motschulsky, 1861
- Litosonycha Chevrolat, 1836 (= Pleurasphaera Bechyné, 1958)
- Loeblaltica Scherer, 1989
- Longitarsus Latreille, 1829
- Loxoprosopus Guérin-Méneville, 1844
- Luperaltica Crotch, 1873
- Luperomorpha Weise, 1887
- Lupraea Jacoby, 1885
- Lypnea Baly, 1876
- Lypneana Medvedev, 2001
- Lysathia Bechyné, 1959
- Lythraria Bedel, 1897

== M ==
- Maaltica Samuelson, 1969
- Macrohaltica Bechyné, 1959
- Malvernia Jacoby, 1899
- Mandarella Duvivier, 1892 (= Stenoluperus Ogloblin, 1936)
- Manobia Jacoby, 1885
- Manobiella Medvedev, 1993
- †Manobiomorpha Nadein, 2010
- Mantura Stephens, 1831
- Marcapatia Bechyné, 1958
- Margaridisa Bechyné, 1958
- Maritubana Bechyné & Bechyné, 1961
- Maturacaita Bechyné & Bechyné, 1977
- Maulika Basu & Sengupta, 1980
- Megasus Jacoby, 1884
- Megistops Boheman, 1859
- Meishania Chen & Wang, 1980
- Mellipora Chûjô, 1965
- Menduos Linzmeier & Konstantinov, 2020
- Meraaltica Scherer, 1962
- Mesodera Jacoby, 1885
- Mesopana Medvedev, 2018
- Metroserrapha Bechyné, 1958
- Micraphthona Jacoby, 1900
- Micrespera Chen & Wang, 1987
- Microcrepis Chen, 1933
- Microdonacia Blackburn, 1893 (Note: A revision of Microdonacia by Reid (1992) placed it in Galerucinae incertae sedis.)
- Microsutrea Jacoby, 1894
- Minota Kutschera, 1859
- Minotula Weise, 1924
- Miritius Bechyné & Bechyné, 1965
- Mistika Mohamedsaid, 2001
- Mniophila Stephens, 1831
- Mniophilosoma Wollaston, 1854
- Monomacra Chevrolat, 1836
- Monotalla Bechyné, 1956
- Montiaphthona Scherer, 1961
- Morylus Jacoby, 1887
- Myrcina Chapuis, 1875
- Myrcinoides Jacoby, 1894
- Myrmeconycha Konstantinov & Tishechkin, 2017

== N ==
- Nankus Chen, 1933
- Nasidia Harold, 1876
- Nasigona Jacoby, 1902
- Neoacanthobioides Bechyné & Bechyné, 1976
- Neoblepharella Özdikmen, 2008 (formerly Blepharella Medvedev, 1999)
- Neocacoscelis Bechyné, 1968
- Neocrepidodera Heikertinger, 1911
- Neodera Duvivier, 1891
- Neodiphaulaca Bechyné & Bechyné, 1975
- Neopraea Jacoby, 1885
- Neorthana Medvedev, 1996
- Neosphaeroderma Savini & Furth, 2001
- Neothona Bechyné, 1955
- Nephrica Harold, 1877
- Nesaecrepida Blake, 1964
- Nicaltica Konstantinov, Chamorro-Lacayo & Savini, 2009
- Nisotra Baly, 1864
- Nonarthra Baly, 1862
- Normaltica Konstantinov, 2002
- Notomela Jacoby, 1899
- Notozona Chevrolat, 1836
- Novascuta Özdikmen, 2008 (formerly Ascuta Medvedev, 1997)
- Novofoudrasia Jacobson, 1901
- Ntaolaltica Biondi & D'Alessandro, 2013
- Nycteronychis Bechyné, 1955
- Nzerekorena Bechyné, 1955

== O ==
- Ochrosis Foudras, 1861
- Ocnoscelis Eruchson, 1847
- Octogonotes Drapiez, 1819
- Oedionychis Latreille, 1829
- Omeiana Chen, 1934
- Omeisphaera Chen & Zia, 1974
- Omophoita Chevrolat, 1836
- Omototus Clark, 1860
- Ophrida Chapuis, 1875
- Opisthopygme Blackburn, 1896
- Oreinodera Bechyné & Bechyné, 1963
- Orestia Chevrolat, 1836
- Orhespera Chen & Wang, 1984
- Orisaltata Prathapan & Konstantinov, 2006
- Orodes Jacoby, 1891

== P ==
- Pachyonychis Clark, 1860
- Pachyonychus Crotch, 1873
- Palaeothona Jacoby, 1885
- Palmaraltica Bechyné, 1959
- Palopoda Erichson, 1847
- Panchrestus Clark, 1860
- Panilurus Jacoby, 1904
- †Paolaltica Biondi, 2014
- Paracacoscelis Bechyné & Bechyné, 1861
- Paradibolia Baly, 1875
- Paralactica Bechyné & Bechyné, 1961
- Paralacticoides Bechyné & Bechyné, 1977
- Paraminota Scherer, 1989
- Paraminotella Döberl & Konstantinov, 2003
- Paranaita Bechyné, 1955
- Parargopus Chen, 1939
- Parasutra Medvedev, 1994
- Parasyphraea Bechyné, 1959
- Parategyrius Kimoto & Gressitt, 1966 (= Lankanella Kimoto, 2000 = Lankaphthona Medvedev, 2001 = Paraphthona Medvedev, 2009)
- Parathrylea Duvivier, 1892
- Paratonfania Medvedev, 1993
- Parazipangia Ohno, 1965
- Parchicola Bechyné & Bechyné, 1975
- Parecynovia Bechyné, 1958
- Parhespera Chen, 1932
- Parlina Motschulsky, 1866
- Parophrida Chen, 1934
- Pedethma Weise, 1923
- Pedilia Clark, 1865
- Peltobothrus Enderlein, 1912
- Penghou Ruan, Konstantinov, Prathapan, Ge & Yang, 2015
- Pentamesa Harold, 1876
- Pepila Weise, 1923
- Perichilona Weise, 1919
- Phaelota Jacoby, 1887
- Phenrica Bechyné, 1957
- Philocalis Boisduval, 1835
- Philogeus Jacoby, 1887
- Philopona Weise, 1903
- Philostogya Weise, 1929
- Phrynocepha Baly, 1861
- Phydanis Horn, 1889
- Phygasia Chevrolat, 1836
- Phygasoma Jacoby, 1898
- Phylacticus Clark, 1860
- Phyllotreta Chevrolat, 1836
- Physimerus Clark, 1860
- Physodactyla Chapuis, 1875
- Physoma Clark, 1863
- Physomandroya Bechyné, 1959
- Physonychis Clark, 1860
- Piobuckia Bechyné, 1956
- Platiprosopus Chevrolat, 1834
- Platycepha Baly, 1878
- Plectrotetra Baly, 1862
- Pleuraltica Sharp, 1886
- Pleurochroma Clark, 1860
- Podagrica Chevrolat, 1836
- Podagricella Chen, 1933
- Podagricomela Heikertinger, 1924
- Podaltica Bechyné & Bechyné, 1963
- Podontia Dalman, 1824
- Polyclada Chevrolat, 1835
- Prasona Baly, 1861
- Pratima Maulik, 1931
- Primulavorus Konstantinov & Ruan in Ruan et al., 2017
- Priobolia Chen & Wang, 1987
- Procalus Clark, 1865
- Profebra Samuelson, 1967
- Propiasus Csiki, 1939
- Prosplecestha Weise, 1921
- †Protorthaltica Nadein, 2019
- Protopsilapha Bechyné & Bechyné, 1973
- Pseudadorium Fairmaire, 1885
- Pseudaphthona Jacoby, 1903
- Pseudargopus Chen, 1933
- Pseudodera Baly, 1861
- Pseudodibolia Jacoby, 1891
- Pseudodisonycha Blake, 1954
- Pseudophygasia Biondi & D'Alessandro, 2013
- Pseudogona Jacoby, 1885
- Pseudolampsis Horn, 1889
- Pseudoliprus Chûjô & Kimoto, 1960
- Pseudorthygia Csiki, 1940
- Pseudostenophyma Furth, 2010
- Psilapha Clark, 1865
- Psylliodes Latreille, 1829
- †Psyllototus Nadein, 2010
- Ptocadica Harold, 1876
- Pydaristes Harold, 1875
- Pyxidaltica Bechyné, 1956

== R ==
- Resistenciana Bechyné, 1958
- Rhinotmetus Clark, 1860
- Rhynchasphaera Bechyné, 1955
- Rhypetra Baly, 1875
- Roicus Clark, 1860
- Rosalactica Bechyné & Bechyné, 1977

== S ==
- Sahyadrialtica Prathapan & Konstantinov, 2022
- Sanariana Bechyné, 1955
- Sanckia Duvivier, 1891
- Sangariola Jacobson, 1922
- Scelidopsis Jacoby, 1888
- Sebaethoides Chen, 1934
- Sericopus Medvedev, 2005
- Serraphula Jacoby, 1897
- Sesquiphaera Bechyné, 1958
- Setsaltica Samuelson, 1971
- Seychellaltica Biondi, 2002
- Simaethea Baly, 1865
- Sinaltica Chen, 1939
- Sinocrepis Chen, 1933
- Sinosphaera Ruan & Konstantinov in Ruan et al., 2017
- Sittacella Weise, 1923
- Sjoestedtinia Weise, 1910
- Sophraena Baly, 1865
- Sophraenella Jacoby, 1904
- Sparnus Clark, 1860
- Sphaeraltica Ohno, 1961 (formerly Lesagealtica Döberl, 2009)
- Sphaerochabria Medvedev, 1999
- Sphaeroderma Stephens, 1831
- Sphaerodermella Ogloblin, 1930
- Sphaerometopa Chapuis, 1875
- Sphaeronychus Dejean, 1837
- Sphaerophrida Chen, 1934
- Sphaeropleura Jacoby, 1887
- Stegnaspea Baly, 1877
- Stegnea Baly, 1879
- Stenophyma Baly, 1877
- Stevenaltica Konstantinov, Linzmeier & Savini, 2014
- Strabala Chevrolat, 1836
- Stuckenbergiana Scherer, 1963
- Styrepitrix Bechyné & Bechyné, 1963
- †Sucinolivolia Bukejs, Biondi & Alekseev, 2015
- Suetes Jacoby, 1891
- Suffrianaltica Konstantinov & Linzmeier, 2020
- Sumatrahaltica Döberl, 2007
- Sutrea Baly, 1876
- Syphrea Baly, 1876
- Systena Chevrolat, 1836

== T ==
- Taiwanohespera Kimoto, 1970
- Taiwanoliprus Komiya, 2006
- Taiwanorestia Kimoto, 1991
- Tamdaoana Medvedev, 2009
- Tebalia Fairmaire, 1889
- Tegyrius Jacoby, 1887
- Temnocrepis Bechyné & Bechyné, 1963
- Tenosis Clark, 1865
- Teresopolisia Bechyné, 1956
- Terpnochlorus Fairmaire, 1904
- Tetragonotes Clark, 1860
- Thrasychroma Jacoby, 1885 (= Licyllus Jacoby, 1885)
- Tonfania Chen, 1936
- Toxaria Weise, 1903
- Trachytetra Sharp, 1886
- Tribolia Chen, 1933
- Trichaltica Harold, 1876
- Trifiniocola Bechyné & Bechyné, 1963
- Triphaltica Bechyné, 1968
- Tritonaphthona Bechyné, 1960

== U ==
- Ugandaltica D'Alessandro & Biondi, 2018
- Ulrica Scherer, 1862
- Upembaltica Bechyné, 1960
- Utingaltica Bechyné, 1961

== V ==
- Vilhenaltica Bechyné & Bechyné, 1964

== W ==
- Walterianella Bechyné, 1955
- Wanderbiltiana Bechyné, 1955
- Warchaltica Döberl, 2007
- Wittmeraltica Bechyné, 1956

== X ==
- Xanthophysca Fairmaire, 1901
- Xenidea Baly, 1862
- Xuthea Baly, 1865

== Y ==
- Yaminia Prathapan & Konstantinov, 2007
- Yemenaltica Scherer, 1985
- Yetialtica Döberl, 1991
- Yoshiakia Takizawa, 2009
- Yumaphthona Bechyné & Bechyné, 1976
- Yungaltica Bechyné, 1959
- Yunohespera Chen & Wang, 1984
- Yunotrichia Chen & Wang, 1980

== Z ==
- Zangaltica Chen & Wang, 1988
- Zeteticus Harold, 1875
- Zipanginia Ohno, 1962
- Zomba Bryant, 1922
