= Sangaria =

Sangaria may refer to:

- Sangaria, India, a city and municipality in the Hanumangarh district of the Indian state of Rajasthan
- Sangaria, a disused synonym of a genus of beetles, Glenidion
- Sangaria (soft drink), a Japanese beverage company, manufactured and marketed by Japan Sangaria Beverage Co., Ltd.
- a misspelling of the cocktail sangria
