= Luperaltica semiflava =

Scientific classification
- Kingdom: Animalia
- Phylum: Arthropoda
- Class: Insecta
- Order: Coleoptera
- Suborder: Polyphaga
- Infraorder: Cucujiformia
- Family: Chrysomelidae
- Genus: Luperaltica
- Species: L. semiflava

Binomial name
- Luperaltica semiflava (Fall in Fall & Cockerell, 1907)

Species of beetle

Luperaltica semiflava is a species of flea beetle in the family Chrysomelidae. It is found in North America.
