= Dysphenges rileyi =

Scientific classification
- Kingdom: Animalia
- Phylum: Arthropoda
- Class: Insecta
- Order: Coleoptera
- Suborder: Polyphaga
- Infraorder: Cucujiformia
- Family: Chrysomelidae
- Tribe: Alticini
- Genus: Dysphenges
- Species: D. rileyi

Binomial name
- Dysphenges rileyi Gilbert & Andrews, 2002

Species of beetle

Dysphenges rileyi is a species of flea beetle in the family Chrysomelidae. It is found in Central America and North America.
