= Margaridisa atriventris =

Scientific classification
- Kingdom: Animalia
- Phylum: Arthropoda
- Class: Insecta
- Order: Coleoptera
- Suborder: Polyphaga
- Infraorder: Cucujiformia
- Family: Chrysomelidae
- Subfamily: Galerucinae
- Tribe: Alticini
- Genus: Margaridisa
- Species: M. atriventris

Binomial name
- Margaridisa atriventris (F. E. Melsheimer, 1847)

Species of beetle

Margaridisa atriventris is a species of flea beetle in the family Chrysomelidae. It is found in North America.
