= Syphrea flavicollis =

Scientific classification
- Kingdom: Animalia
- Phylum: Arthropoda
- Class: Insecta
- Order: Coleoptera
- Suborder: Polyphaga
- Infraorder: Cucujiformia
- Family: Chrysomelidae
- Tribe: Alticini
- Genus: Syphrea
- Species: S. flavicollis

Binomial name
- Syphrea flavicollis (Jacoby, 1884)

Species of beetle

Syphrea flavicollis is a species of flea beetle in the family Chrysomelidae. It is found in Central America and North America.
