= Luperaltica senilis =

Scientific classification
- Kingdom: Animalia
- Phylum: Arthropoda
- Class: Insecta
- Order: Coleoptera
- Suborder: Polyphaga
- Infraorder: Cucujiformia
- Family: Chrysomelidae
- Genus: Luperaltica
- Species: L. senilis

Binomial name
- Luperaltica senilis (Say, 1824)

Species of beetle

Luperaltica senilis is a species of flea beetle in the family Chrysomelidae. It is found in North America.
