= Notozona =

Scientific classification
- Kingdom: Animalia
- Phylum: Arthropoda
- Class: Insecta
- Order: Coleoptera
- Suborder: Polyphaga
- Infraorder: Cucujiformia
- Family: Chrysomelidae
- Tribe: Alticini
- Genus: Notozona; Chevrolat, 1836

Genus of flea beetles

Notozona is a genus of flea beetles belonging to the family Chrysomelidae. The 22 species of this genus are found in Central and Southern America. The genus is closely related to Blepharida.

== Selected species ==
- Notozona bifasciata (Olivier, 1789)
- Notozona macularia Clark, 1865
- Notozona novemmaculata Clark, 1865
