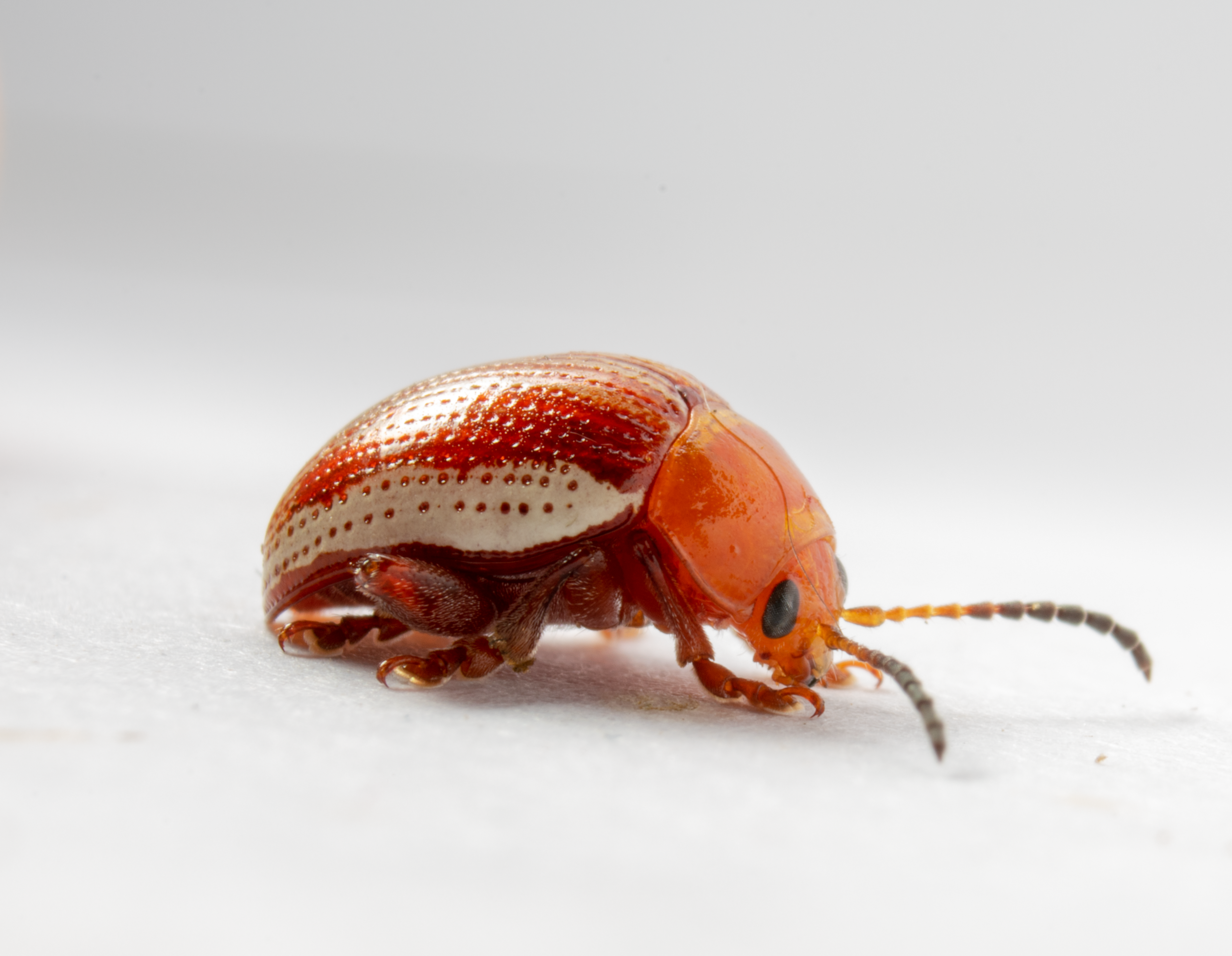

Scientific classification
- Kingdom: Animalia
- Phylum: Arthropoda
- Clade: Pancrustacea
- Class: Insecta
- Order: Coleoptera
- Suborder: Polyphaga
- Infraorder: Cucujiformia
- Family: Chrysomelidae
- Subfamily: Galerucinae
- Tribe: Alticini
- Genus: Blepharida
- Species: B. rhois

Binomial name
- Blepharida rhois (Forster, 1771)

= Blepharida rhois =

Species of beetle

The sumac flea beetle, Blepharida rhois, is most commonly found in North America and is a member of the herbivorous beetle family, Chrysomelidae. More specifically, this beetle is part of the Alticinae subfamily, a highly diverse subfamily that includes more than 1000 species in 550 genera. Members of the Alticinae subfamily are distinguished by their enlarged metafemora and their ability to jump up to 100 times their length. This gives the beetle the ability to catapult jump in order to escape approaching predators. This ability has led to the common name of “flea beetle.” Both larvae and adults are typically a quarter of an inch long. While adults are cream colored with irregular reddish patterns, larvae are typically gray with yellow stripes.

This beetle primarily feeds on the external surface of Rhus leaves. Through this diet, larvae are able to digest useful chemical compounds that can be used as a form of chemical defense against predators. This defense system is contained in a fecal shield, a key characteristic of this beetle’s larvae. Because Rhus plants are necessary for the production of this chemical defense system, B. rhois’ geographic distribution often correlates with the presence of Rhus plants.

== Taxonomy ==
The Blepharida group is primarily made up of brightly colored flea beetles. There are nineteen genera in this group, and they share similarities in eye shape, metatibial, aedageal, and spermathecal morphology. Species in this group typically feed on host plants in the Anacardiaceae, Bignoniaceae, Burseraceae, and Sapindaceae. Among Blepharida-group genera, Blepharida is the best known and most robust. There are 55 species within Blepharida, including Blepharida rhois, Blepharida dorothea, Blepharida sacra, and Blepharida evanida. All Blepharida adults typically lay clusters of eggs on branches and protect them with fecal material covering.

== Geographic range ==
The Blepharida genus includes 73 different species, half of which are from tropical Africa, and the other half are from the New World tropics. The Blepharida rhois is a species of outlying distribution found widespread in North America. It is most commonly spotted in states of the more northerly regions of the continent. This species distribution extends from Virgian to Alberta in the east and Montana in the west. This is atypical as all other members of the Blepharida species inhabit Mexico and Central America.

== Food resources ==
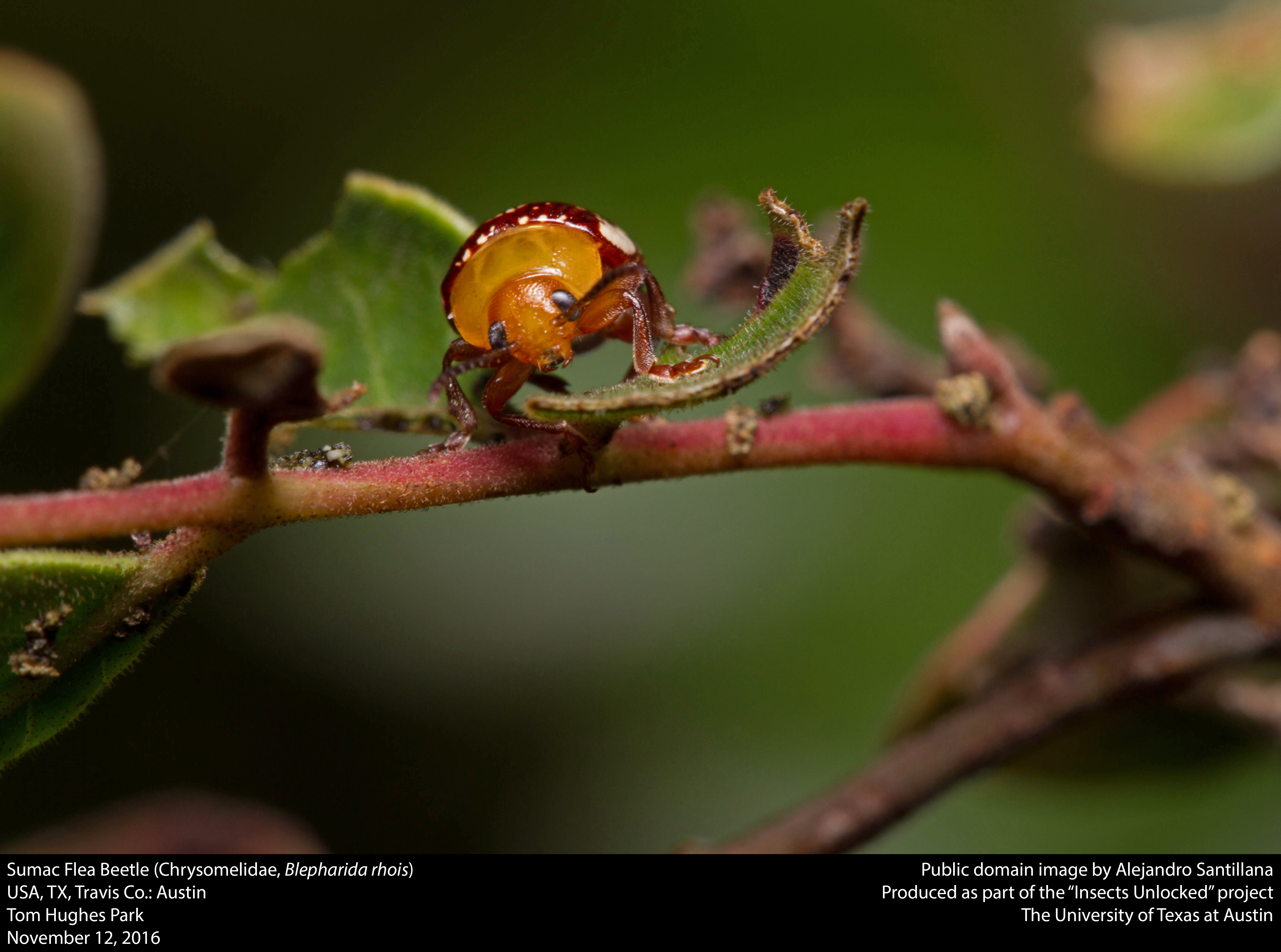
Sumac Flea Beetle feeds on external sides of leaves.

Adults and larvae are considered dietary specialists that exclusively feed on the sumac genus, Rhus. This species of beetle typically feeds on smooth sumac, R. glabra, exclusively. Most New World species feed on Bursera instead, so this beetle is one of the few New World species that feeds on Rhus. This beetle’s herbivory pattern is extremely patchy. Some regions of plants become defoliated while nearby regions are untouched, indicating that this variation may be due to secondary chemistry among the plants. Host versus non-host plants have been found to differ in the amount of chemicals that B. rhois larvae can incorporate into their defense, specifically the presence of tannic acid conjugates and of phytol.

B. rhois typically feed on the external surface of leaves. Larvae, after emerging from the fecula after 10 to 14 days, will crawl up the stems of the Rhus plant and feed on the youngest leaf tissue or flower bud. Larvae will feed alone on young leaflets, but when feeding on an older leaf, they may line up in groups. Larvae, unable to fly and lacking a hard protective cuticle, face exposure and vulnerability to predators. The fecal shield provides a source of chemical defense, so the larvae deter predators that want to take advantage of its vulnerability while feeding.

== Life history ==
=== Eggs/Larvae ===
Eggs are usually laid on leaves and branches in fecal egg casings. They are typically elliptical in shape and are 0.4 mm long with a white to yellowish-gray color. Larvae will hatch from eggs approximately two weeks after ovopositioning occurs. They crawl to the top of the plant and begin to feed on the leaves and flowers of the plant. They then proceed to cover themselves in feces, in an effort to avoid predators such as ants and insectivorous birds. First instar larvae appear most frequently in early spring, aligning with leaf expansion. Peak feeding occurs from late May to the start of June. Full grown larvae will then crawl to the soil to pupate.

=== Adults ===
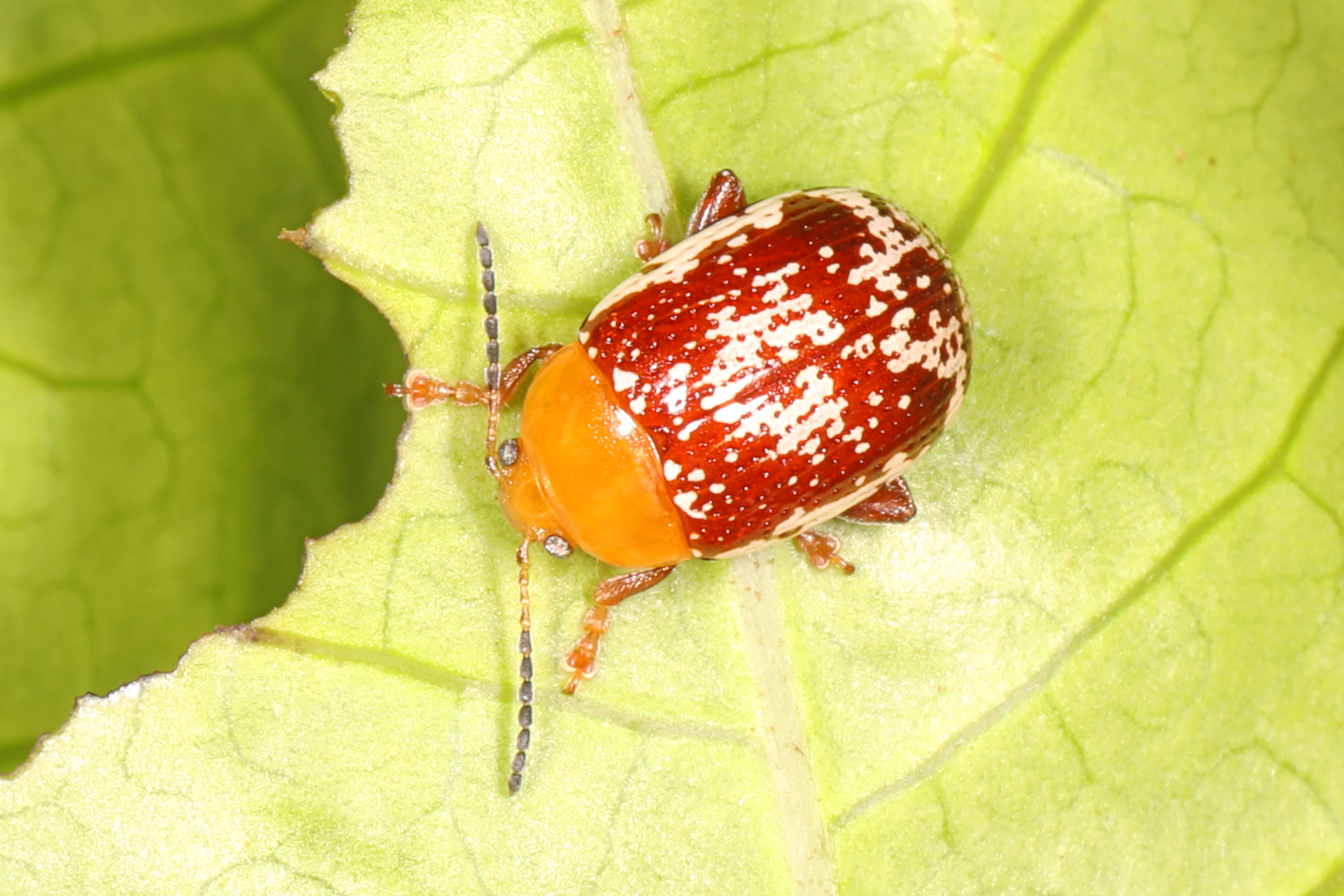

Adults will emerge from the pupa after approximately two weeks and will feed on leaves through September before moving to sheltered areas for protection against winter. Flea beetles will find a protected place such as under leaves, dirt, or weeds along fields or ditches to escape the winter. This will be often at the site where they have been previously feeding. Overwintering adults emerge during the early spring and immediately oviposition on sumac stems. Activity of adults depends on the abundance of food. Adults will hop from plant to plant but are typically sedentary if food resources are in surplus. They may choose to travel longer distances through flight if food is in shortage. Since larvae and adults use the same foliar resources, the beetle may choose to remain at its natal location if there are still enough resources left for it to feed on as an adult. Females are typically fecund and long lived, and they oviposit over several weeks, but reproduce no more than two new generations per summer. Females can lay several hundred eggs at a time and will often do so at their own natal site.

In the summer, as the temperature begins to increase, adults may choose to aestivate or transition to dormancy. They often opt to do this in early and mid July due to the warmer temperatures and will re-emerge in the late summer or early fall to feed and then overwinter as adults. As a result, if many opt to aestivate, B. rhois may be less commonly spotted in early September and October.

== Protective behavior ==
=== Fecal shields ===
One of the most notable characteristics of the sumac flea beetle is its defense system. While both larvae and adult beetles feed on Rhus genus plants, only larvae construct fecal shields. Instead of discarding their feces, B. rhois larvae store it on their backs to create viscous mounds, also known as a fecal “shield.” The beetle uses the dorsal anus and a neuromuscular propulsion system to transport the feces forward to the larvae’s back. These fecal shields remain deployed as long as larvae continue to eat. The shield has been considered a source of concealment, insulation, or as a physical and chemical barrier against enemies. Research shows that these shields are an effective chemical deterrent against attacking predators. When ants try to attack this beetle’s larvae, the ants immediately withdraw, grooming their antennae and wiping their mouth against the substrate.

Chemical analysis conducted on these fecal shields have found that they are formed primarily from primary and secondary metabolites obtained from the host plant with little modification. The shields contained a mixture of fatty acids, tannins (gallic acid and methyl gallate), and diterpene alcohol (phytol). Rhus has high tannic acid content, and through hydrolysis of tannic acids in the larval gut, B. rhois is able to produce free gallic acid and methyl gallate. Gallic acid and methyl gallate are behavioral modifiers, deterring this beetle’s predators. These compounds also provide anti-microbial protection, helping the shield remain free of pathogens.

=== Jumping ===
The presence of a meta femoral spring in the femur of the beetle’s hind legs allows them to perform a catapult jump. This jumping ability is an effective method for this species to avoid predators, as they are quickly able to disappear from the surface of the leaf they are feeding on. Despite their small size, the flea beetle is able to jump very high and accelerates quickly, allowing for this quick escape.

== Physiology ==
Adults are moderately sized with well developed hind legs to assist with jumping. The wings of B. rhois are typically cream colored with red-brown striped markings. The beetle’s pyothorax and head are an orange color. They have slender antennae attached to the head. B. rhois larvae are a gray or yellow color and are a cylindrical shape. Their outward appearance is slightly shiny and palely striped, and their heads are black. B. rhois has a traverse series of setiferous punctures along the anterior border of the clypeus, compared to the more commonly found traverse depression in the clypeus possessed by other beetles in the New World Blepharida clade.

The beetle is typically around 6.5 mm long and around 4.0 mm wide. Females are typically slightly larger in size than males. There may be some minor variation in appearance between individuals. For instance, some beetles of this species may be narrower or shorter or may have elytra that are completely red and brown.

=== Hind legs ===
The ability of the flea beetle to jump to high distances despite its small size depends on the presence of a meta femoral spring in the femur of its hind legs. Fused to the inner wall of the femur is the base of an “elastic plate.” It is situated ventro-distally on the inner wall, near the femorotibial joint. This plate has a rubber-like and elastic apical and middle segment and resembles a small tendon. It is semi-transparent, milky white, with an ellipsoid and elastic structure. An internal structure called Lever’s triangular plate also works in conjunction with the meta femoral spring.

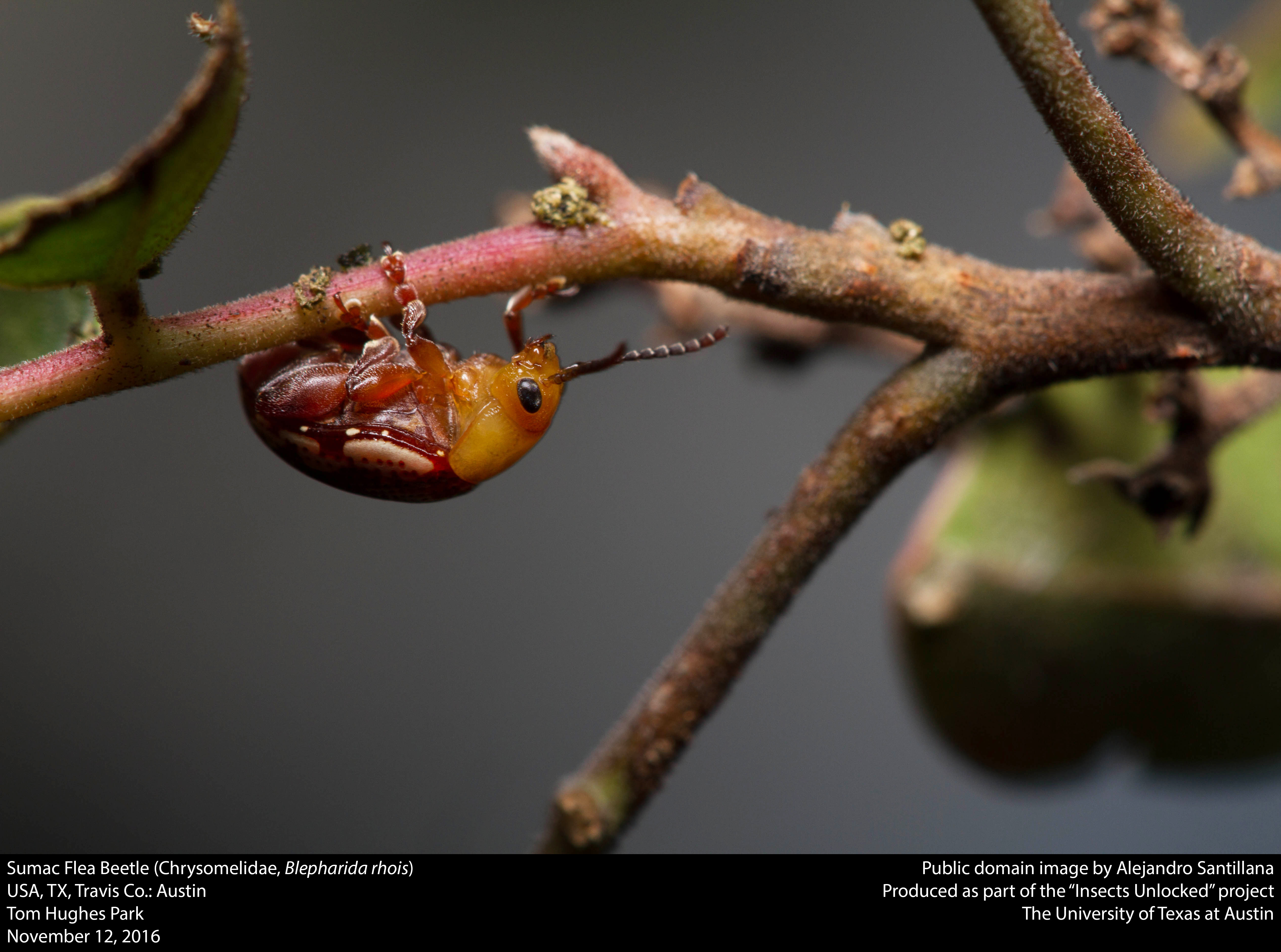

The jump process physiologically takes place through four phases. In the first phase, the flea beetle flexes its hind legs until the femorotibial angle creates a minimum of 20 degree angle. This can take place in under 20 ms. Phase two then begins where in 4 to 5 ms, the angle increases to 60 degrees, and elastic strain energy cumulatively builds. The tibial extensor and flexor muscles contract simultaneously, and the tibia starts to revolve around the tibial pivot. Lever’s triangular plate is drawn out and will momentarily get caught on the elastic plate. The meta femoral spring is then stretched by the tibia extensor muscle, creating a catapult mechanism in the femur. In phase 3, once the accumulated tension reaches its maximum, the triangular plate is dislodged in 1 to 2 ms, resulting in an explosive jump. The acceleration occurs quickly, reaching maximum speed in less than 1 ms. In the last phase, the femorotibial angle reaches 130 degrees and no more tension is released.

== Interactions with humans and livestock ==
This beetle can be considered a pest for the sumac tree. Because larvae cause most of the primary damage to plants during their intense feeding phase, integrated pest management programs advise for leaves to be monitored for larvae in mid to late May. To inhibit B. rhois as a pest, the soil may be broken up by farmers during July when the beetle is pupating in the soil. Insecticides may be applied to branches and leaves of plants shortly after egg hatching to control larvae feeding. While pesticides are only needed in more extreme cases where monitoring is ineffective, the pesticides used may include Bacillus thuringiensis var. tenebrionis, carbamade, lead arsenate, and pyrethroid. This is primarily to ensure Rhus plants maintain overall health because larvae feeding can lead to plant death if unmonitored.
