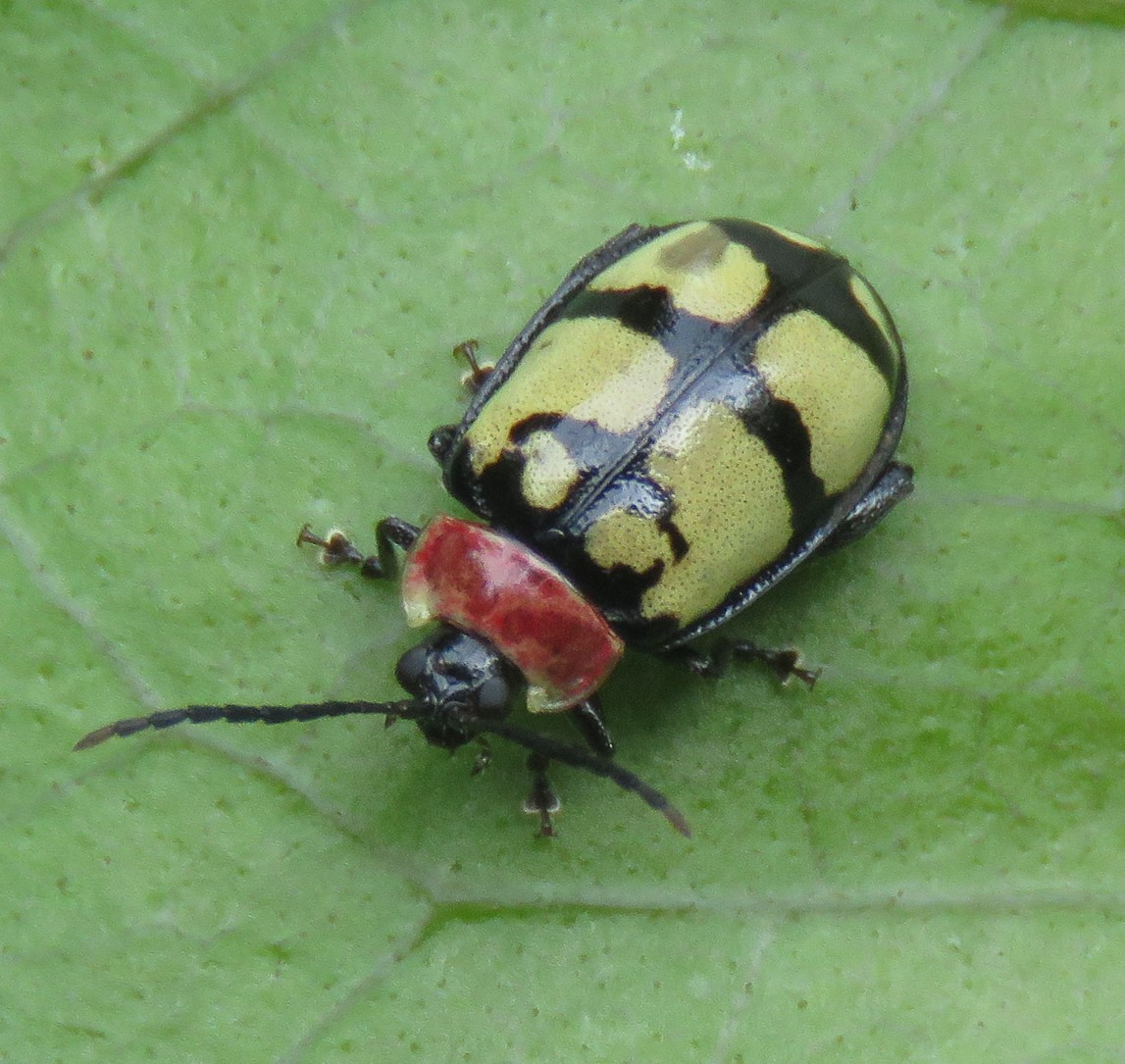
- Alagoasa januaria, Brazil

Scientific classification
- Kingdom: Animalia
- Phylum: Arthropoda
- Class: Insecta
- Order: Coleoptera
- Suborder: Polyphaga
- Infraorder: Cucujiformia
- Family: Chrysomelidae
- Subfamily: Galerucinae
- Tribe: Alticini
- Genus: Alagoasa; Bechyné, 1955

= Alagoasa =

Genus of beetles

Alagoasa is a genus of flea beetles in the family Chrysomelidae, containing some 140 species, found in the Neotropics.

== Selected species ==
- Alagoasa angulosignata
- Alagoasa apicalis
- Alagoasa areata
- Alagoasa aurora
- Alagoasa bipunctata
- Alagoasa burmeisteri
- Alagoasa ceracollis
- Alagoasa coccinelloides
- Alagoasa condensa
- Alagoasa cruxnigra
- Alagoasa decemguttata
- Alagoasa dissepta
- Alagoasa fasciata
- Alagoasa jacobiana
- Alagoasa januaria
- Alagoasa scissa
- Alagoasa seriata
- Alagoasa vigintiseptemmaculata
