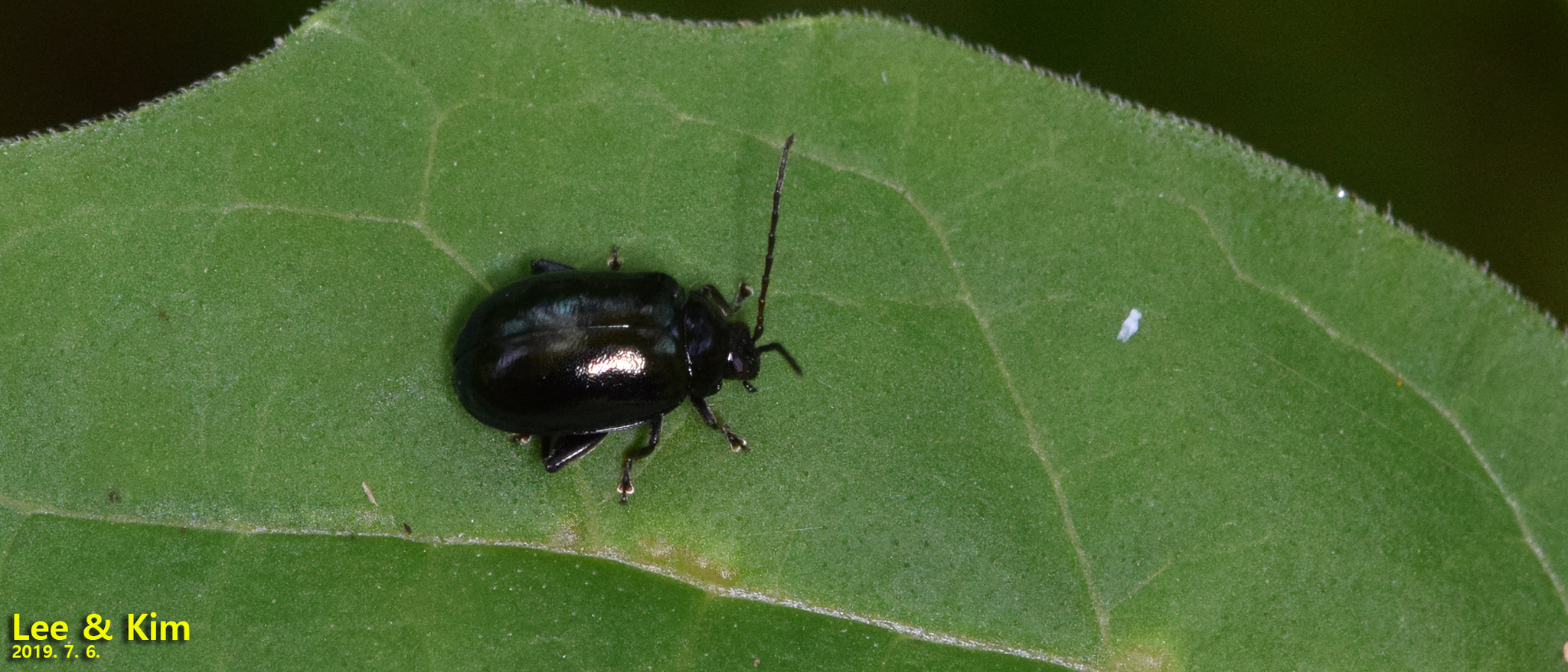
- Hemipyxis plagioderoides, South Korea

Scientific classification
- Kingdom: Animalia
- Phylum: Arthropoda
- Class: Insecta
- Order: Coleoptera
- Suborder: Polyphaga
- Infraorder: Cucujiformia
- Family: Chrysomelidae
- Subfamily: Galerucinae
- Tribe: Alticini
- Genus: Hemipyxis; Dejean, 1836

= Hemipyxis =

Genus of flea beetles

Hemipyxis is a genus of flea beetles in the family Chrysomelidae. They are found in Sub-Saharan Africa, eastern Asia, and Australasia.

== Species ==
These 27 species, along with a number of others, belong to the genus Hemipyxis:

- Hemipyxis apicicostata Kimoto, 1989 (temperate Asia)
- Hemipyxis balyi Bates, 1866 (temperate Asia)
- Hemipyxis bipustulata (Jacoby, 1894) (Oceania)
- Hemipyxis changi Kimoto, 1970 (temperate Asia)
- Hemipyxis flava (Clark, 1865) (Oceania)
- Hemipyxis flaviabdominalis Chujo, 1965 (temperate Asia)
- Hemipyxis flavipes Kimoto, 1978 (temperate Asia)
- Hemipyxis formosana Chujo, 1937 (temperate Asia)
- Hemipyxis fulvipennis (Illiger, 1807) (Oceania)
- Hemipyxis fulvoculata Takizawa, 1979 (temperate Asia)
- Hemipyxis kinabaluensis Takizawa, 2017
- Hemipyxis lineata Kimoto, 1978 (temperate Asia)
- Hemipyxis liukueiana Kimoto, 1996 (temperate Asia)
- Hemipyxis lusca (Fabricius, 1801)
- Hemipyxis nigricornis (Baly, 1877) (temperate Asia)
- Hemipyxis persimilis Kimoto, 1996 (temperate Asia)
- Hemipyxis plagioderoides Motschulsky, 1861
- Hemipyxis quadrimaculata (Jacoby, 1892)
- Hemipyxis quadripustulata (Baly, 1876) (temperate Asia)
- Hemipyxis rarashana Kimoto, 1996 (temperate Asia)
- Hemipyxis semiviridis (Jacoby, 1894)
- Hemipyxis sumatrana (Jacoby, 1884) (Oceania)
- Hemipyxis taihorinensis S.Kimoto, 1966 (temperate Asia)
- Hemipyxis takedai Kimoto, 1976 (temperate Asia)
- Hemipyxis tonkinensis (Chen, 1933)
- Hemipyxis yasumatsui Kimoto, 1970 (temperate Asia)
- Hemipyxis yuae Lee & Staines, 2009 (temperate Asia)
