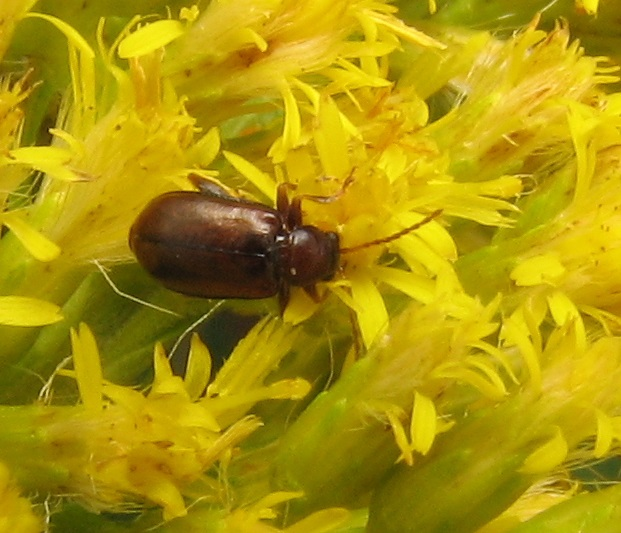

Scientific classification
- Kingdom: Animalia
- Phylum: Arthropoda
- Clade: Pancrustacea
- Class: Insecta
- Order: Coleoptera
- Suborder: Polyphaga
- Infraorder: Cucujiformia
- Family: Chrysomelidae
- Genus: Luperaltica
- Species: L. nigripalpis

Binomial name
- Luperaltica nigripalpis (J. L. LeConte, 1859)

= Luperaltica nigripalpis =

Species of beetle

Luperaltica nigripalpis is a species of flea beetle in the family Chrysomelidae. It is found in North America.
