= Acrocyum =

Scientific classification
- Kingdom: Animalia
- Phylum: Arthropoda
- Clade: Pancrustacea
- Class: Insecta
- Order: Coleoptera
- Suborder: Polyphaga
- Infraorder: Cucujiformia
- Superfamily: Chrysomeloidea
- Family: Chrysomelidae
- Subfamily: Galerucinae
- Tribe: Alticini
- Genus: Acrocyum; Jacoby, 1885

Type species
- Acrocyum dorsale Jacoby, 1885

Genus of beetles

Acrocyum is a genus of flea beetles in the family Chrysomelidae. There are six described species in Acrocyum, which are distributed in North and Central America, including the West Indies. The genus is included in the Blepharida-group of genera.

== Species ==
The genus includes the following species:

- Acrocyum dorsale Jacoby, 1885 – Mexico
- Acrocyum haitiense (Blake, 1938) – Hispaniola
- Acrocyum interpositum (Bechyné & Bechyné, 1963) – El Salvador
- Acrocyum maculicolle Jacoby, 1885 – Mexico
- Acrocyum sallaei Jacoby, 1885 – Mexico, southern Arizona?
- Acrocyum tarsatum Jacoby, 1885 – Guatemala
