= Cerataltica =

Scientific classification
- Kingdom: Animalia
- Phylum: Arthropoda
- Class: Insecta
- Order: Coleoptera
- Suborder: Polyphaga
- Infraorder: Cucujiformia
- Family: Chrysomelidae
- Subfamily: Galerucinae
- Tribe: Alticini
- Genus: Cerataltica; Crotch, 1873
- Species: C. insolita

Binomial name
- Cerataltica insolita (Melsheimer, 1847)

Genus of beetles

Cerataltica is a genus of flea beetles in the family Chrysomelidae. It contains a single described species, C. insolita.
