= Burumoseria =

Scientific classification
- Kingdom: Animalia
- Phylum: Arthropoda
- Class: Insecta
- Order: Coleoptera
- Suborder: Polyphaga
- Infraorder: Cucujiformia
- Family: Chrysomelidae
- Subfamily: Galerucinae
- Tribe: Alticini
- Genus: Burumoseria; Csiki, 1939

Synonyms
- Moseria Weise, 1922 (nec Ghigi, 1909)

Genus of flea beetles

Burumoseria is a genus of beetles belonging to the family Chrysomelidae. It is distributed in the Oriental realm.

== Species ==
The following three species are included in Burumoseria:

- Burumoseria marginipennis (Medvedev, 2009) – Thailand
- Burumoseria partita (Weise, 1922) – Buru
- Burumoseria yuae Lee & Konstantinov, 2015 – Taiwan
