= Parasyphraea =

Scientific classification
- Kingdom: Animalia
- Phylum: Arthropoda
- Clade: Pancrustacea
- Class: Insecta
- Order: Coleoptera
- Suborder: Polyphaga
- Infraorder: Cucujiformia
- Superfamily: Chrysomeloidea
- Family: Chrysomelidae
- Subfamily: Galerucinae
- Tribe: Alticini
- Genus: Parasyphraea; Bechyne, 1959

Genus of beetles

Parasyphraea is a genus of flea beetles belonging to the family Chrysomelidae. They are found in South America (Colombia, Venezuela, Brazil, Peru, Bolivia).

== Species ==
- Parasyphraea alaida Bechyné & Bechyné, 1961
- Parasyphraea attenuaticornis Bechyné & Bechyné, 1961
- Parasyphraea bicostulata Bechyné & Bechyné, 1961
- Parasyphraea biolena Bechyné, 1967
- Parasyphraea bordoni Bechyné & Bechyné, 1964
- Parasyphraea citrirubra Bechyné & Bechyné, 1964
- Parasyphraea desvia Bechyné & Bechyné, 1964
- Parasyphraea egleri Bechyné & Bechyné, 1965
- Parasyphraea foveifrons (Bechyné, 1956)
- Parasyphraea geniculata Bechyné & Bechyné, 1964
- Parasyphraea granulosa Bechyné & Bechyné, 1961
- Parasyphraea hetaera Bechyné, 1967
- Parasyphraea homolimbia Bechyné, 1959
- Parasyphraea irupana Bechyné, 1959
- Parasyphraea isolda Bechyné, 1959
- Parasyphraea liodina (Bechyné, 1958)
- Parasyphraea llama (Bechyné, 1956)
- Parasyphraea marina Bechyné, 1967
- Parasyphraea mesomera Bechyné & Bechyné, 1964
- Parasyphraea nigriceps (Boheman, 1859)
- Parasyphraea palissandra Bechyné, 1959
- Parasyphraea pantana Bechyné, 1967
- Parasyphraea paraiba (Bechyné, 1958)
- Parasyphraea pleurica Bechyné & Bechyné, 1961
- Parasyphraea retroversa Bechyné & Bechyné, 1961
- Parasyphraea sampaia Bechyné & Bechyné, 1961
- Parasyphraea selecta Bechyné & Bechyné, 1961
- Parasyphraea sinuatella Bechyné & Bechyné, 1961
- Parasyphraea solitaria Bechyné, 1967
- Parasyphraea sulcifera Bechyné & Bechyné, 1961
- Parasyphraea ultrasimilis (Bechyné, 1954)
- Parasyphraea xantholimbia Bechyné, 1959
- Parasyphraea yeda Bechyné & Bechyné, 1961
