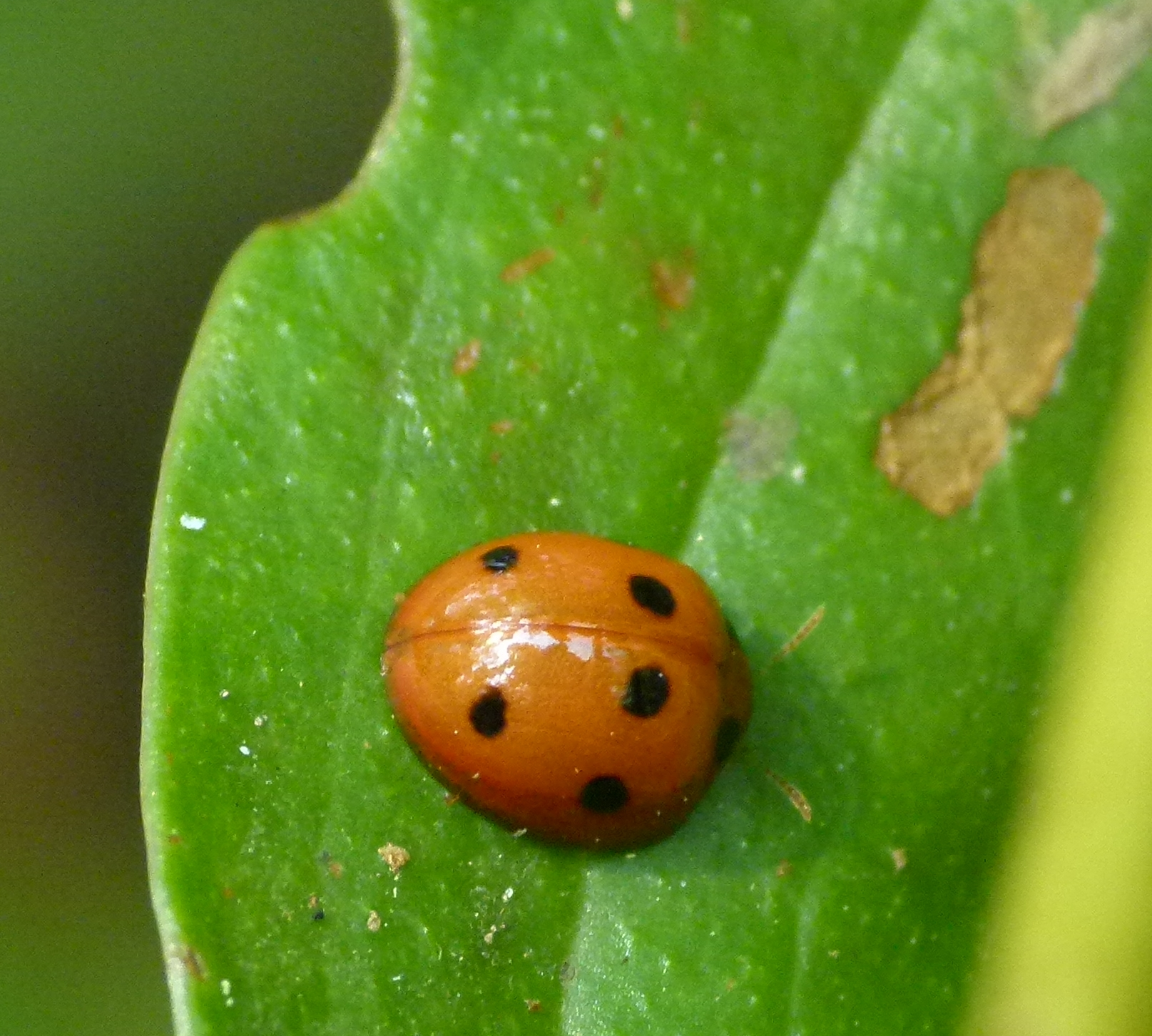
- A species from India on Smilax

Scientific classification
- Kingdom: Animalia
- Phylum: Arthropoda
- Clade: Pancrustacea
- Class: Insecta
- Order: Coleoptera
- Suborder: Polyphaga
- Infraorder: Cucujiformia
- Family: Chrysomelidae
- Tribe: Alticini
- Genus: Chilocoristes; Weise, 1895

Type species
- Argopistes bistripunctatus Duvivier, 1892

= Chilocoristes =

Genus of flea beetles

Chilocoristes is a genus of flea beetles found in the Oriental realm. They are round and can be mistaken for ladybird beetles in the genus Chilocorus although the clubbed antennae set them apart. They have the third tarsal segment entire (and not bilobed). The hind tarsi have the first segment shorter than half the tibia length. The hind tibia lack any apical processes. The epipleuron of the elytra is vertical and the maxillary palps have globose apices. Some species feed on the leaves of Smilax.

Species that have been placed in the genus include:

- Chilocoristes besar Takizawa, 2017
- Chilocoristes bipunctatus Medvedev, 2011
- Chilocoristes bistripunctatus (Duvivier, 1892)
- Chilocoristes borneoensis L.Medvedev, 2016
- Chilocoristes fulvus Medvedev, 1999
- Chilocoristes funestus Weise, 1909
- Chilocoristes justinahae Takizawa, 2017
- Chilocoristes laysi Medvedev, 2011
- Chilocoristes mohamedsaidi Medvedev, 1998
- Chilocoristes moyogensis Takizawa, 2017
- Chilocoristes nigromarginatus Takizawa, 2017
- Chilocoristes obscurus Medvedev, 2011
- Chilocoristes punctatus Weise, 1895
- Chilocoristes sabahensis Medvedev, 2011
- Chilocoristes schawalleri L.Medvedev, 2016
- Chilocoristes septemmaculatus Chen, 1934
- Chilocoristes trilineatus Medvedev, 2007
