= Hemiglyptus =

Scientific classification
- Kingdom: Animalia
- Phylum: Arthropoda
- Class: Insecta
- Order: Coleoptera
- Suborder: Polyphaga
- Infraorder: Cucujiformia
- Family: Chrysomelidae
- Subfamily: Galerucinae
- Tribe: Alticini
- Genus: Hemiglyptus; Horn, 1889
- Species: H. basalis

Binomial name
- Hemiglyptus basalis (Crotch, 1874)

Genus of beetles

Hemiglyptus is a genus of flea beetles in the family Chrysomelidae. There were originally 5 described species (one from the Nearctic and 4 from Chile), but the latter have been moved to the genus Psilapha, so the sole member of the genus at present is Hemiglyptus basalis.
