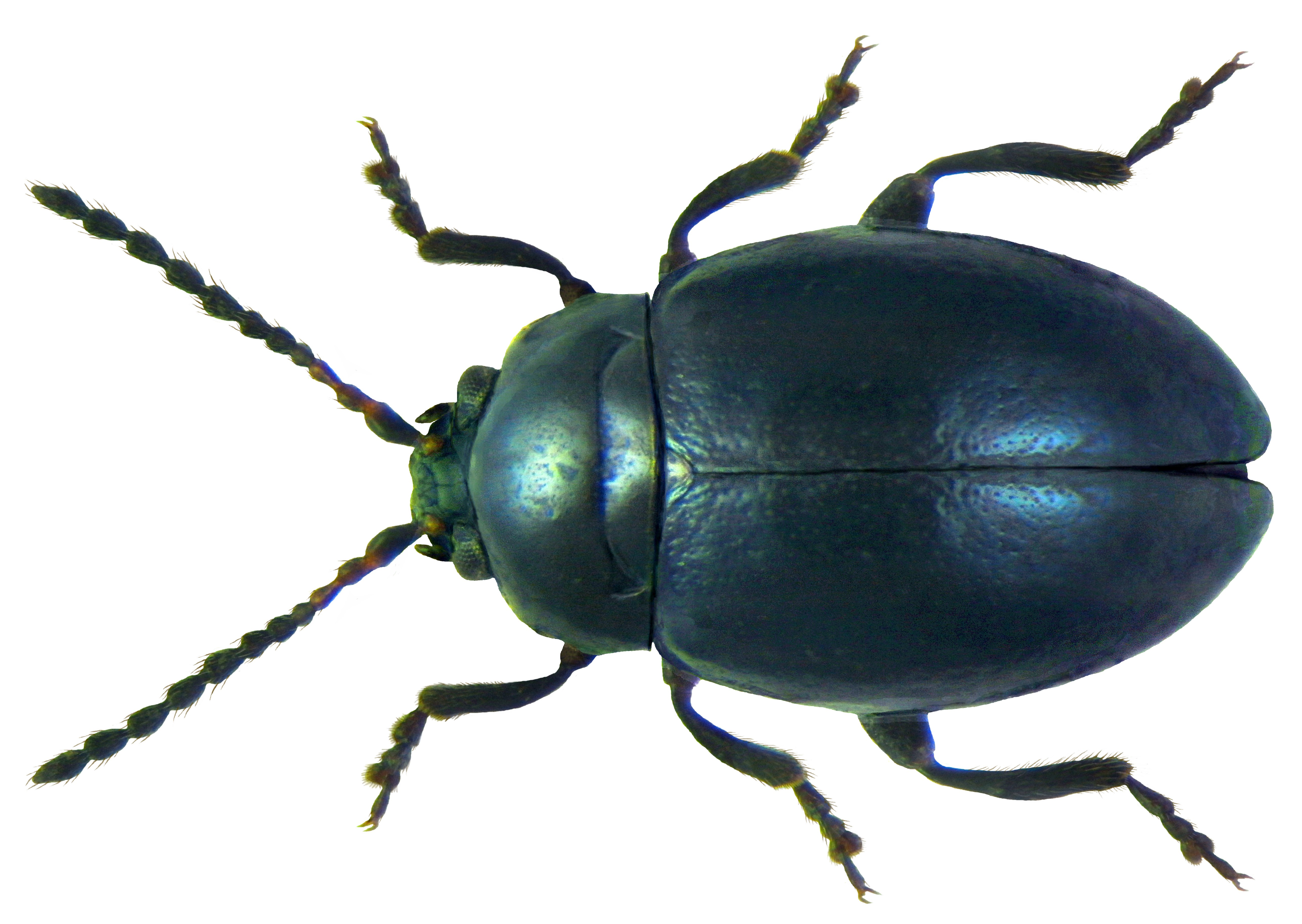
- Hermaeophaga mercurialis

Scientific classification
- Kingdom: Animalia
- Phylum: Arthropoda
- Class: Insecta
- Order: Coleoptera
- Suborder: Polyphaga
- Infraorder: Cucujiformia
- Superfamily: Chrysomeloidea
- Family: Chrysomelidae
- Subfamily: Galerucinae
- Tribe: Alticini
- Genus: Hermaeophaga; Foudras, 1859

Synonyms
- Linozosta Allard, 1860

= Hermaeophaga =

Genus of beetles

Hermaeophaga is a genus of beetles belonging to the family Chrysomelidae. There are some 60 described species, from the Palaearctic, Oriental, and Afrotropical regions.

== Selected species ==
- Hermaeophaga acuminata
- Hermaeophaga adamsi Balý, 1874
- Hermaeophaga aemula Bechyné, 1948
- Hermaeophaga mercurialis
