= Margaridisa =

Scientific classification
- Kingdom: Animalia
- Phylum: Arthropoda
- Class: Insecta
- Order: Coleoptera
- Suborder: Polyphaga
- Infraorder: Cucujiformia
- Family: Chrysomelidae
- Tribe: Alticini
- Genus: Margaridisa; J. Bechyné, 1958

Genus of beetles

Margaridisa is a genus of flea beetles in the family Chrysomelidae. There are at least 16 described species in Margaridisa.

== Species ==
These sixteen species belong to the genus Margaridisa:

- Margaridisa acalyphaea Bechyné, 1997
- Margaridisa atriventris (F. E. Melsheimer, 1847)
- Margaridisa bahiensis (Bryant, 1942)
- Margaridisa benficana Bechyné & Bechyné, 1961
- Margaridisa buritiensis Bechyné & Bechyné, 1978
- Margaridisa flavescens (Baly, 1976)
- Margaridisa genalis Bechyné & Bechyné, 1978
- Margaridisa hippuriphilina Bechyné & Bechyné, 1978
- Margaridisa laevisulcata Bechyné & Bechyné, 1978
- Margaridisa luciana (Bechyné, 1955)
- Margaridisa managua (Bechyné, 1957)
- Margaridisa mattogrossensis (Bechyné, 1954)
- Margaridisa mera Bechyné & Bechyné, 1978
- Margaridisa osmidia (Bechyné, 1955)
- Margaridisa praesignata Bechyné, 1997
- Margaridisa reticulaticollis (Bechyné, 1955)
- Margaridisa triangularis Bechyné & Bechyné, 1978
