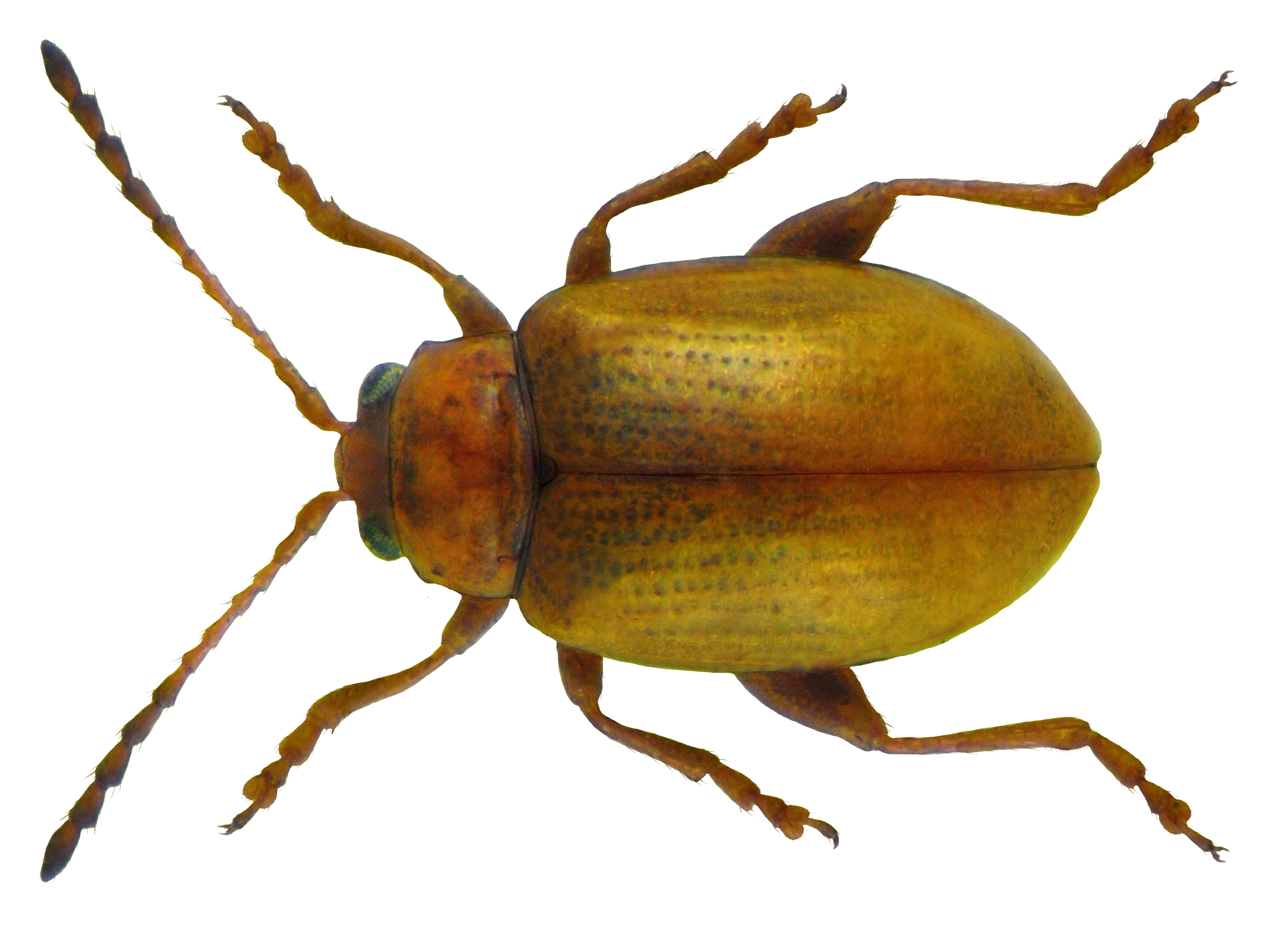

Scientific classification
- Kingdom: Animalia
- Phylum: Arthropoda
- Class: Insecta
- Order: Coleoptera
- Suborder: Polyphaga
- Infraorder: Cucujiformia
- Family: Chrysomelidae
- Subfamily: Galerucinae
- Tribe: Alticini
- Genus: Ochrosis; Foudras, 1859
- Species: O. ventralis

Binomial name
- Ochrosis ventralis (Illiger, 1807)

= Ochrosis ventralis =

Genus and species of beetle

Ochrosis ventralis is a species of flea beetle native to Europe and parts of North Africa, and the sole member of the genus Ochrosis. Adults are found on leaves of nightshades (Solanum spp), the larvae probably feed at the roots. O. ventralis is also associated with Anagallis arvensis and Pistacia lentiscus.
