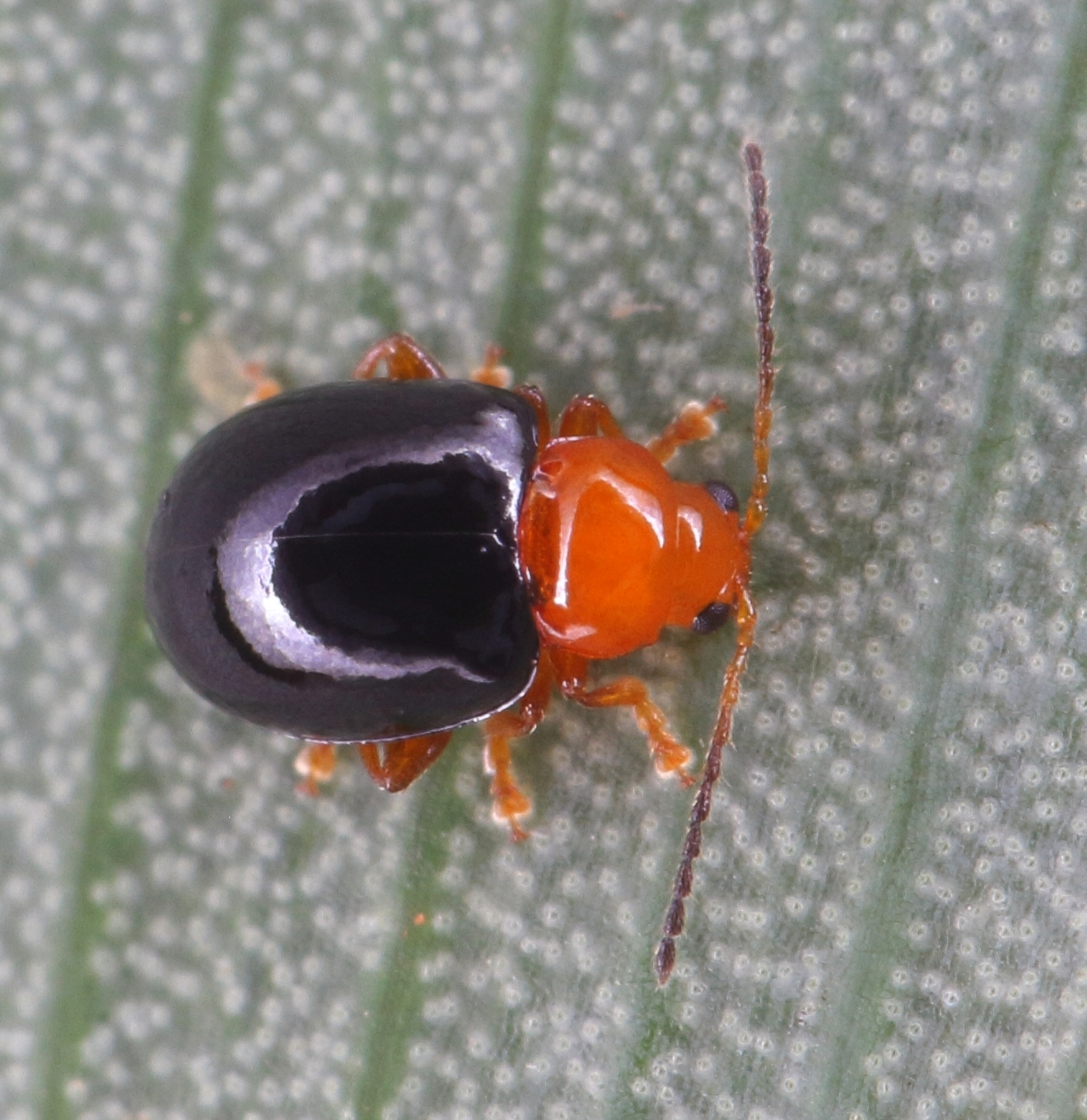
- Stuckenbergiana glabrata

Scientific classification
- Kingdom: Animalia
- Phylum: Arthropoda
- Class: Insecta
- Order: Coleoptera
- Suborder: Polyphaga
- Infraorder: Cucujiformia
- Family: Chrysomelidae
- Subfamily: Galerucinae
- Tribe: Alticini
- Genus: Stuckenbergiana; Scherer, 1963
- Species: S. glabrata

Binomial name
- Stuckenbergiana glabrata (Jacoby, 1899)

= Stuckenbergiana =

Genus of beetles

Stuckenbergiana is a genus of flea beetles belonging to the family Chrysomelidae. There is a single described species, Stuckenbergiana glabrata, which is found in South Africa.

== Description ==
This beetle is small (3 mm long). The head and pronotum (thorax) are orange, and the elytra, breast, and abdomen black. The antennae are filiform, orange at the base and blackish towards the apex. The pronotum is transverse (width greater than length) with sides that are strongly rounded with narrow margins, and an antebasal transverse groove. The scutellum is small and the elytra are strongly convex, much wider at the base than the thorax.

== Taxonomy ==
Stuckenbergiana glabrata (Jacoby 1899) was originally described as Podagrica glabrata, but Scherer created the genus Stuckenbergiana because the species was sufficiently different from other species of Podagrica.
