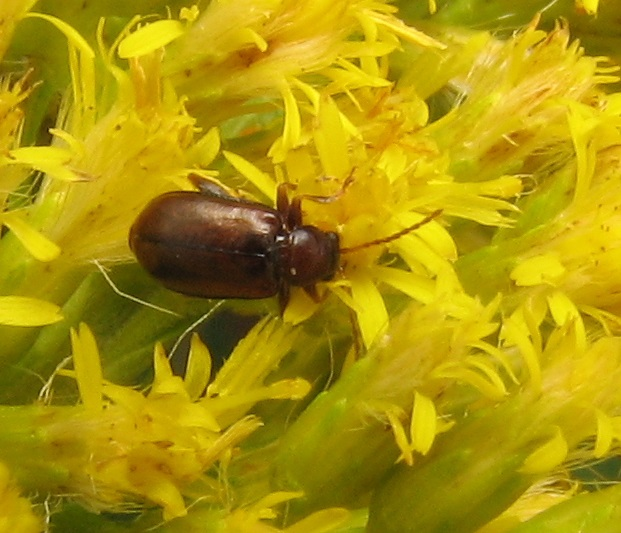
- Luperaltica nigripalpis

Scientific classification
- Kingdom: Animalia
- Phylum: Arthropoda
- Class: Insecta
- Order: Coleoptera
- Suborder: Polyphaga
- Infraorder: Cucujiformia
- Family: Chrysomelidae
- Tribe: Alticini
- Genus: Luperaltica; Crotch, 1873

= Luperaltica =

Genus of beetles

Luperaltica is a genus of flea beetles in the family Chrysomelidae. There are at least four described species in Luperaltica from North America, and others from Mexico.

== North American species ==
- Luperaltica nigripalpis (J. L. LeConte, 1859)
- Luperaltica nitida Wilcox, 1953
- Luperaltica semiflava (Fall in Fall & Cockerell, 1907)
- Luperaltica senilis (Say, 1824)
