= Syphrea =

Scientific classification
- Kingdom: Animalia
- Phylum: Arthropoda
- Class: Insecta
- Order: Coleoptera
- Suborder: Polyphaga
- Infraorder: Cucujiformia
- Superfamily: Chrysomeloidea
- Family: Chrysomelidae
- Subfamily: Galerucinae
- Tribe: Alticini
- Genus: Syphrea; Baly, 1876

Genus of beetles

Syphrea is a genus of flea beetles in the family Chrysomelidae. There are about 100 described species, found in North America and the Neotropics.

== Selected species ==
- Syphrea burgessi (Crotch, 1873)
- Syphrea flavicollis (Jacoby, 1884)
- Syphrea nana (Crotch, 1873)
- Syphrea nitidiventris (Fall, 1910)
- Syphrea speciosa (Olivier, 1818)
