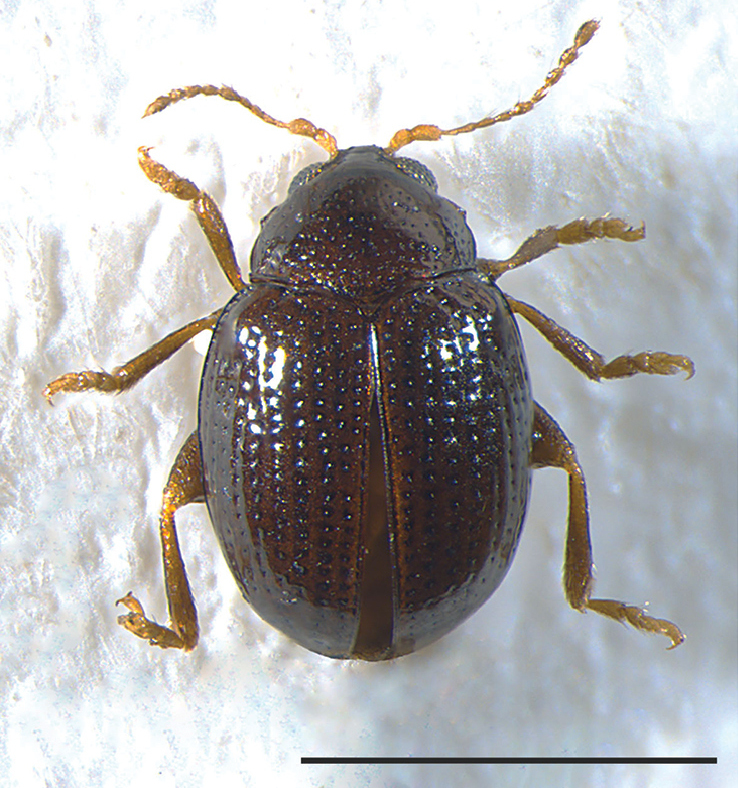

Scientific classification
- Kingdom: Animalia
- Phylum: Arthropoda
- Class: Insecta
- Order: Coleoptera
- Suborder: Polyphaga
- Infraorder: Cucujiformia
- Family: Chrysomelidae
- Subfamily: Galerucinae
- Tribe: Alticini
- Genus: Ugandaltica; D'Alessandro & Biondi, 2018
- Species: U. wagneri

Binomial name
- Ugandaltica wagneri D'Alessandro & Biondi, 2018

= Ugandaltica =

Genus of insects

Ugandaltica wagneri, is a species of flea beetle belonging to the family Chrysomelidae. It was discovered in 2018 from canopies in the Budongo Forest, Uganda. The species was placed in the monotypic genus Ugandaltica.

== Etymology ==
The generic name is due to the country it was found first. Specific name wagneri is in honor of collector Thomas Wagner, a specialist Afrotropical entomologist.

== Description ==
A very small beetle with a convex body. Short antennae. Smooth frons and vertex. Frontal tubercles absent. Three-segmented labial palpi. Pronotum sub-trapezoidal. Elytra indistinctly elongate and covers pygidium. Metathoracic wings are macropterous. Dorsum brownish and shiny.
