= Hornaltica =

Scientific classification
- Kingdom: Animalia
- Phylum: Arthropoda
- Class: Insecta
- Order: Coleoptera
- Suborder: Polyphaga
- Infraorder: Cucujiformia
- Family: Chrysomelidae
- Subfamily: Galerucinae
- Tribe: Alticini
- Genus: Hornaltica; Barber, 1941
- Species: H. bicolorata

Binomial name
- Hornaltica bicolorata (Horn, 1889)

Genus of beetles

Hornaltica is a genus of flea beetles in the family Chrysomelidae. There is only one described species, H. bicolorata, found in North America.
