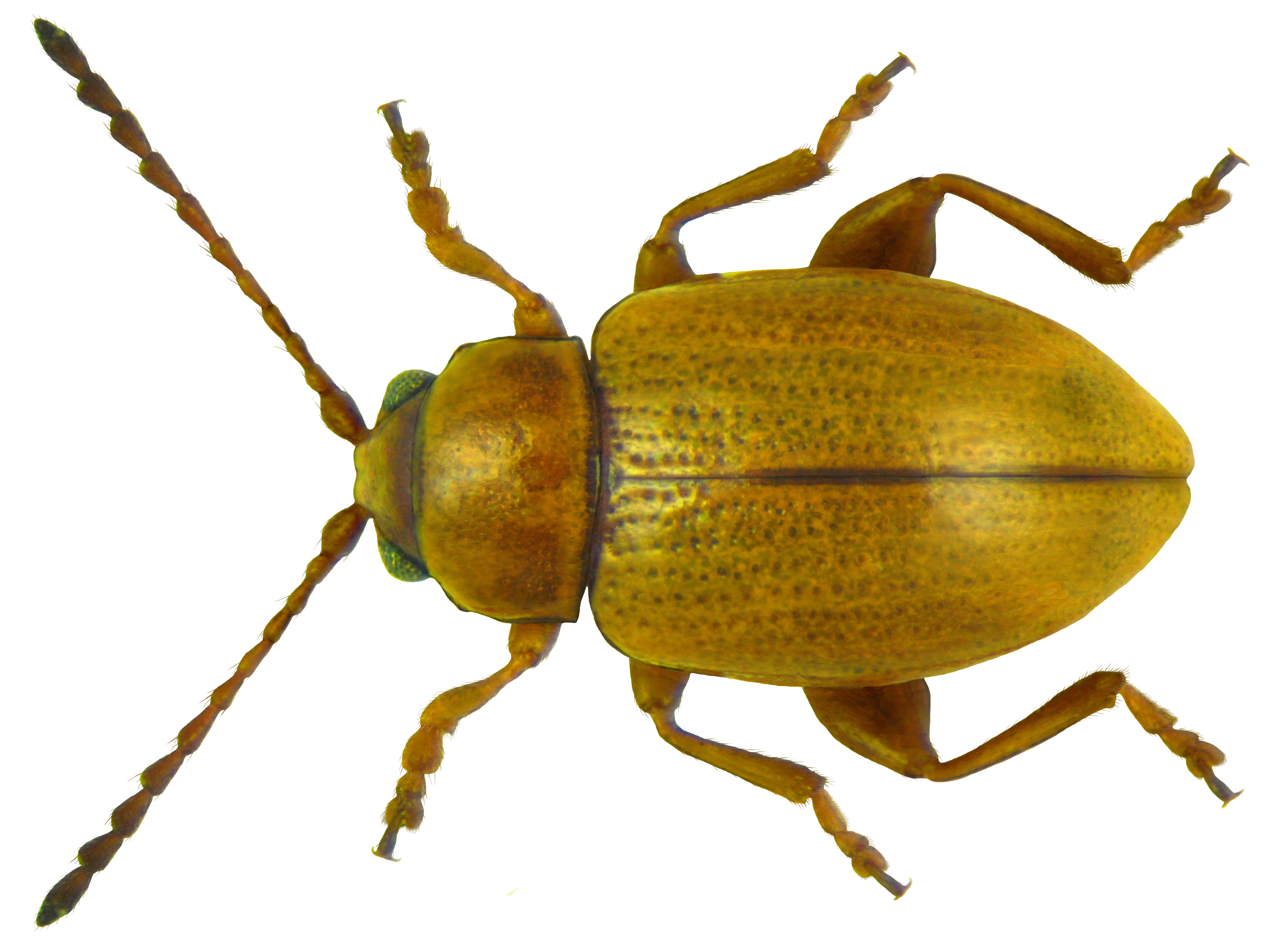

Scientific classification
- Kingdom: Animalia
- Phylum: Arthropoda
- Class: Insecta
- Order: Coleoptera
- Suborder: Polyphaga
- Infraorder: Cucujiformia
- Family: Chrysomelidae
- Subfamily: Galerucinae
- Tribe: Alticini
- Genus: Lythraria; Bedel, 1897
- Species: L. salicariae

Binomial name
- Lythraria salicariae (Paykull, 1800)

Synonyms
- Paraphthonomorpha Ohno, 1960

= Lythraria =

Genus of flea beetles

Lythraria is a genus of flea beetles in the family Chrysomelidae, containing a single described species, Lythraria salicariae, from the Palaearctic.
