= Dysphenges =

Scientific classification
- Kingdom: Animalia
- Phylum: Arthropoda
- Class: Insecta
- Order: Coleoptera
- Suborder: Polyphaga
- Infraorder: Cucujiformia
- Family: Chrysomelidae
- Tribe: Alticini
- Genus: Dysphenges; Horn, 1894

Genus of beetles

Dysphenges is a genus of flea beetles in the family Chrysomelidae. There are 4 described species in North America and Central America.

== Selected species ==
- Dysphenges penrosei
- Dysphenges rileyi Gilbert & Andrews, 2002
- Dysphenges secretus
