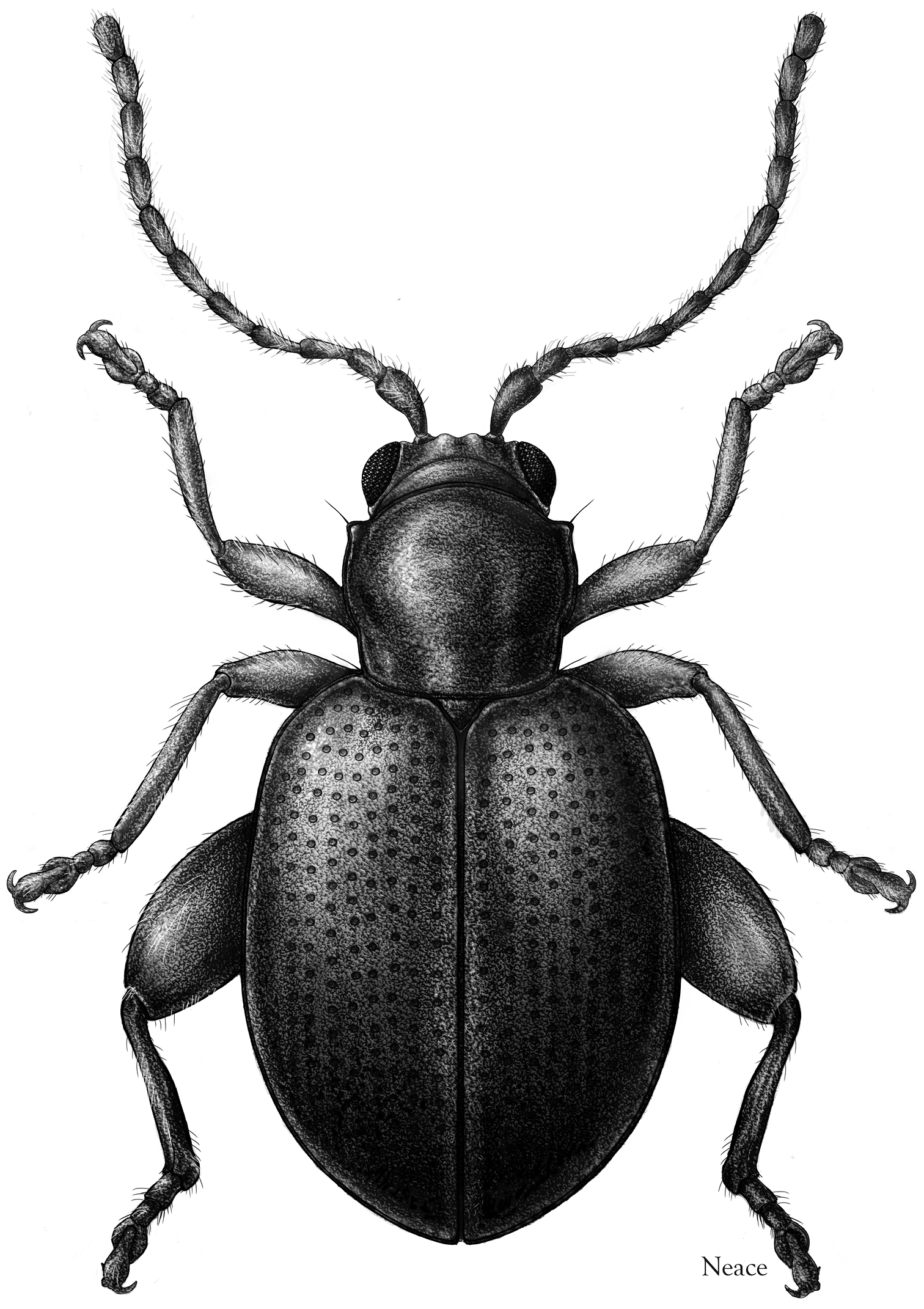
- An artist depiction of an Andersonoplatus, a genus of flea beetles

Scientific classification
- Kingdom: Animalia
- Phylum: Arthropoda
- Class: Insecta
- Order: Coleoptera
- Suborder: Polyphaga
- Infraorder: Cucujiformia
- Family: Chrysomelidae
- Subfamily: Galerucinae
- Tribe: Alticini
- Genus: Andersonoplatus; Linzmeier & Konstantinov, 2018

Type species
- Andersonoplatus microoculus Linzmeier & Konstantinov, 2018

= Andersonoplatus =

Genus of flea beetles

Andersonoplatus is a genus of flightless flea beetles belonging to the family Chrysomelidae, subfamily Galerucinae. All 16 species are new to science and discovered from Venezuela and Panama.

== Species ==
This genus includes the following 16 species:

- Andersonoplatus andersoni
- Andersonoplatus baru
- Andersonoplatus bechyneorum
- Andersonoplatus castaneus
- Andersonoplatus flavus
- Andersonoplatus jolyi
- Andersonoplatus laculata
- Andersonoplatus lagunanegra
- Andersonoplatus macubaji
- Andersonoplatus merga
- Andersonoplatus merida
- Andersonoplatus microoculus
- Andersonoplatus peck
- Andersonoplatus rosalesi
- Andersonoplatus sanare
- Andersonoplatus saviniae
