= Pseudorthygia =

Scientific classification
- Kingdom: Animalia
- Phylum: Arthropoda
- Class: Insecta
- Order: Coleoptera
- Suborder: Polyphaga
- Infraorder: Cucujiformia
- Superfamily: Chrysomeloidea
- Family: Chrysomelidae
- Subfamily: Galerucinae
- Tribe: Alticini
- Genus: Pseudorthygia; Csiki, 1940

Synonyms
- Orthygia Jacoby, 1891 (Preocc.)

Genus of flea beetles

Pseudorthygia is a genus of flea beetles in the family Chrysomelidae. There are 2 described species found in Mexico.

== Species ==
- Pseudorthygia nigritarsis (Jacoby, 1891)
- Pseudorthygia unifasciata (Jacoby, 1891)
