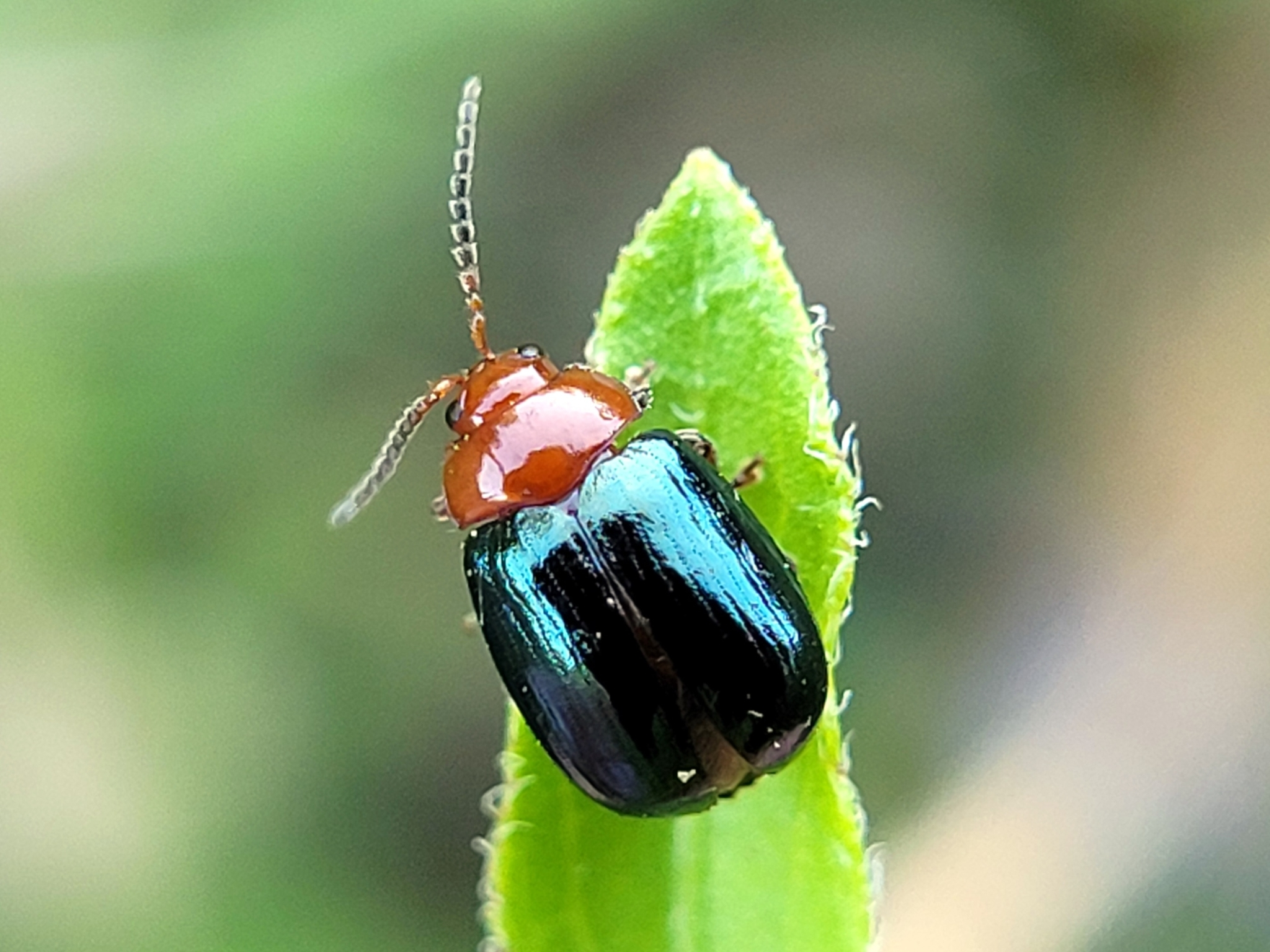
- Phydanis bicolor

Scientific classification
- Kingdom: Animalia
- Phylum: Arthropoda
- Clade: Pancrustacea
- Class: Insecta
- Order: Coleoptera
- Suborder: Polyphaga
- Infraorder: Cucujiformia
- Superfamily: Chrysomeloidea
- Family: Chrysomelidae
- Subfamily: Galerucinae
- Tribe: Alticini
- Genus: Phydanis; Horn, 1889

= Phydanis =

Genus of beetles

Phydanis is a genus of flea beetles in the family Chrysomelidae. There are two described species, found in North America.

== Species ==
- Phydanis bicolor Horn, 1889
- Phydanis nigriventris Jacoby
