= Hemiphrynus =

Scientific classification
- Kingdom: Animalia
- Phylum: Arthropoda
- Class: Insecta
- Order: Coleoptera
- Suborder: Polyphaga
- Infraorder: Cucujiformia
- Superfamily: Chrysomeloidea
- Family: Chrysomelidae
- Subfamily: Galerucinae
- Tribe: Alticini
- Genus: Hemiphrynus; Horn, 1889

Genus of beetles

Hemiphrynus is a genus of flea beetles in the family Chrysomelidae. There are 8 described species from the Nearctic and Neotropics.

== Selected species ==
- Hemiphrynus elongatus (Jacoby, 1884)
- Hemiphrynus intermedius (Jacoby, 1884)
- Hemiphrynus sulcatipennis Jacoby, 1891
- Hemiphrynus tenuicornis Jacoby, 1891
