= Pseudodibolia =

Scientific classification
- Kingdom: Animalia
- Phylum: Arthropoda
- Class: Insecta
- Order: Coleoptera
- Suborder: Polyphaga
- Infraorder: Cucujiformia
- Superfamily: Chrysomeloidea
- Family: Chrysomelidae
- Subfamily: Galerucinae
- Tribe: Alticini
- Genus: Pseudodibolia; Jacoby, 1891

Genus of beetles

Pseudodibolia is a genus of flea beetles in the family Chrysomelidae. There are 4 described species in North America and the Neotropics.

== Selected species ==
- Pseudodibolia opima (LeConte, 1878)
- Pseudodibolia picea Jacoby, 1891
