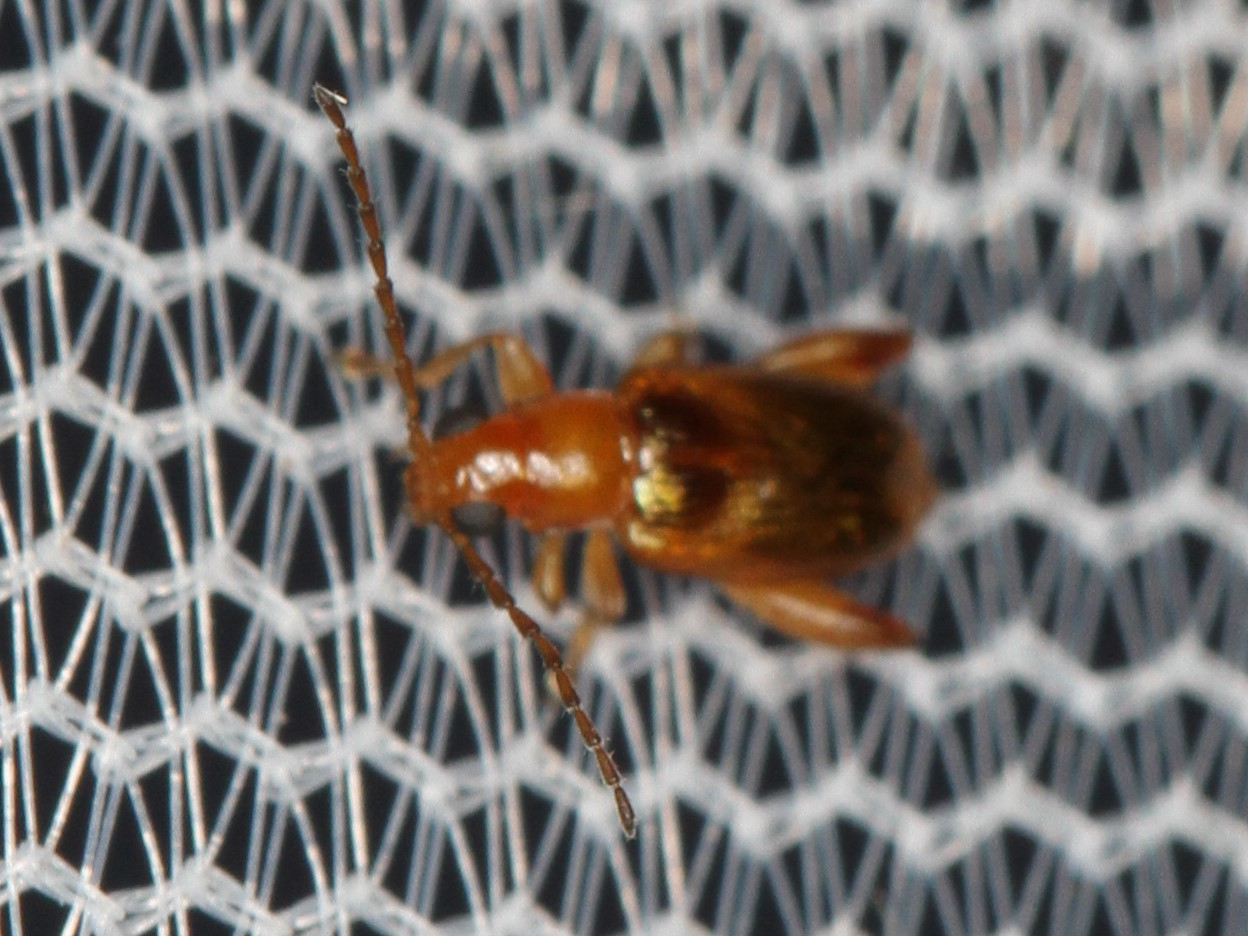
- Glenidion flexicaulis

Scientific classification
- Kingdom: Animalia
- Phylum: Arthropoda
- Clade: Pancrustacea
- Class: Insecta
- Order: Coleoptera
- Suborder: Polyphaga
- Infraorder: Cucujiformia
- Family: Chrysomelidae
- Subfamily: Galerucinae
- Tribe: Alticini
- Genus: Glenidion; H. Clark, 1860

Synonyms
- Ptinomorpha Harold, 1875; Sangaria Harold, 1876; Tenosis Clark, 1865

= Glenidion =

Genus of beetles

Glenidion is a genus of flea beetles in the family Chrysomelidae. There are 12 species recognised and are found in the Neotropics.

== Selected species ==
- Glenidion atrox
- Glenidion flexicaulis (Schaeffer, 1905)
- Glenidion herbigradum
