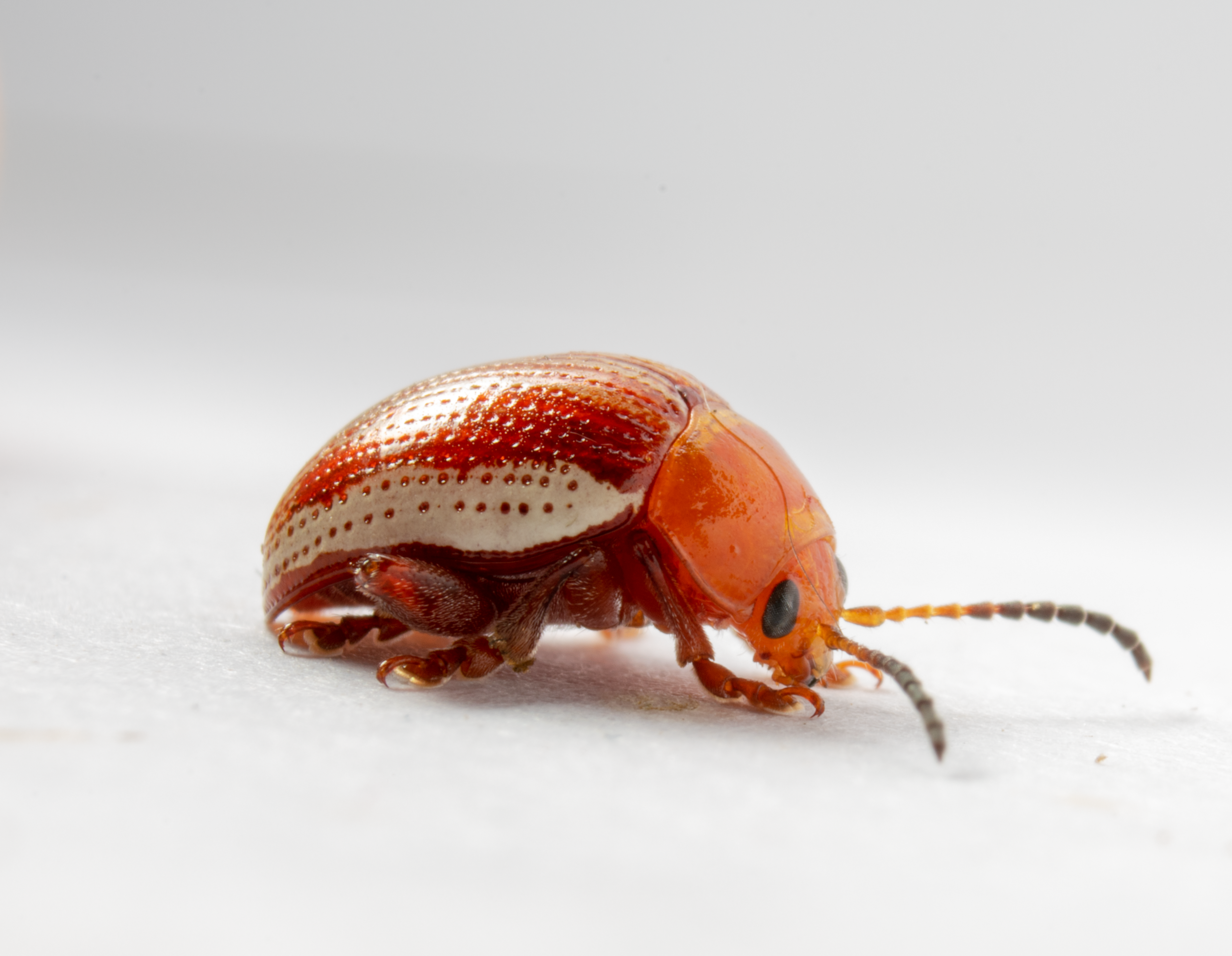
- Adult Blepharida rhois, or Sumac Flea Beetle

Scientific classification
- Domain: Eukaryota
- Kingdom: Animalia
- Phylum: Arthropoda
- Class: Insecta
- Order: Coleoptera
- Suborder: Polyphaga
- Infraorder: Cucujiformia
- Family: Chrysomelidae
- Subfamily: Galerucinae
- Tribe: Alticini
- Genus: Blepharida; Chevrolat, 1836

Species
- See text

= Blepharida =

Genus of beetles

Blepharida is a genus of leaf beetles of the subfamily Galerucinae. They have co-evolved with plants in the genus Bursera, which they feed on. The plants have developed a sticky, poisonous resin that sprays out when the leaves are bitten into, and the beetles have evolved to cut through the veins of the leaves to disable this mechanism first. There are currently 73 known species in Blepharida, which are found in the Nearctic, Neotropical, Afrotropical and southern Palearctic realms.

== Structure ==
The exact structure of the genus is contentious, and remains unresolved. In 1940, Heikertinger and Csiki considered Blepharida to include three subgenera, Blepharida sensu stricto, Blepharidella, and Calotheca. In 1968, Bechyné elevated both to the status of genera, and erected a new genus Blepharidina to contain Afrotropical species of Blepharida. In 1982, Seeno and Wilcox returned to the three subgenera described by Heikertinger and Csiki, but retained Blepharidina; despite this, in 1983, Scherer placed many Afrotropical species in Blepharida. In 1992, Furth reclassified Blepharidina as a subgenus of Blepharida. Cladistic analysis in 2004 indicated that Blepharida species from the New World are a single clade, and Afrotropical species are a separate but related clade.

Blepharida and its related genera have been referred to as the Blepharida-group. In 1998, Furth considered it to have sixteen genera, and in 1999 Medvedev added three more for a total of nineteen.

== Selected species ==
- Blepharida alternata
- Blepharida atripennis
- Blepharida balyi
- Blepharida bryanti
- Blepharida condrasi
- Blepharida conspersa
- Blepharida flavocostata
- Blepharida florhi
- Blepharida gabrielae
- Blepharida hinchahuevosi
- Blepharida humeralis
- Blepharida irrorata
- Blepharida johngi
- Blepharida judithae
- Blepharida lineata
- Blepharida maculicollis
- Blepharida marginalis
- Blepharida melanoptera
- Blepharida multimaculata
- Blepharida natalensis
- Blepharida nigromaculata
- Blepharida nigrotesselata
- Blepharida pallida
- Blepharida parallela
- Blepharida rhois
- Blepharida sacra
- Blepharida schlechtendalii
- Blepharida singularis
- Blepharida sonorstriata
- Blepharida sparsa
- Blepharida unami
- Blepharida variegatus
- Blepharida verdea
- Blepharida vittata
- Blepharida xochipala
