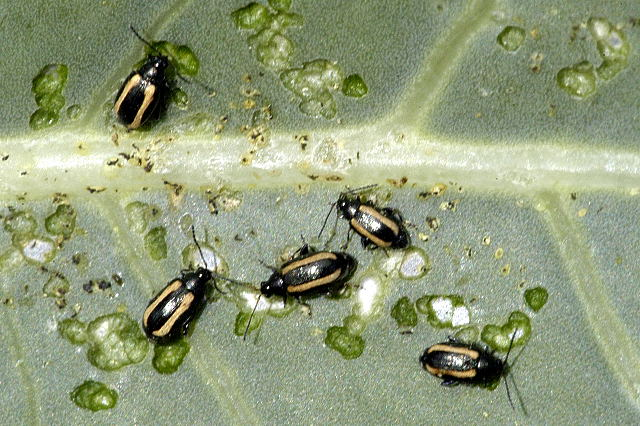
- Phyllotreta vittula with characteristic feeding damage to Brassicaceae leaf

Scientific classification
- Kingdom: Animalia
- Phylum: Arthropoda
- Clade: Pancrustacea
- Class: Insecta
- Order: Coleoptera
- Suborder: Polyphaga
- Infraorder: Cucujiformia
- Family: Chrysomelidae
- Subfamily: Galerucinae
- Tribe: Alticini; Newman, 1834

Genera
- Many, see text

Diversity
- >500 genera >8000 species

= Flea beetle =

Flea beetles

Tribe of small jumping beetles

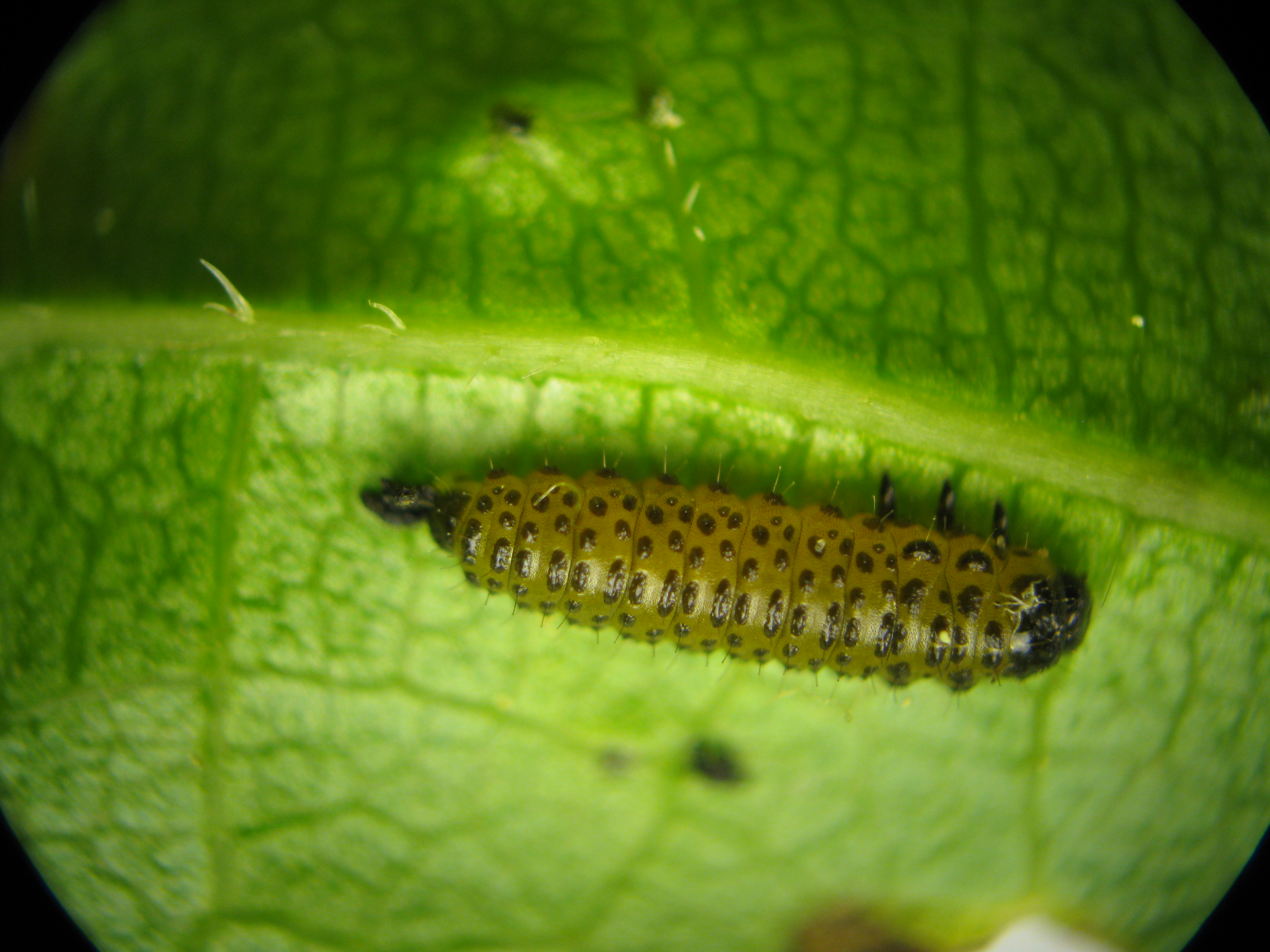
Altica species larva

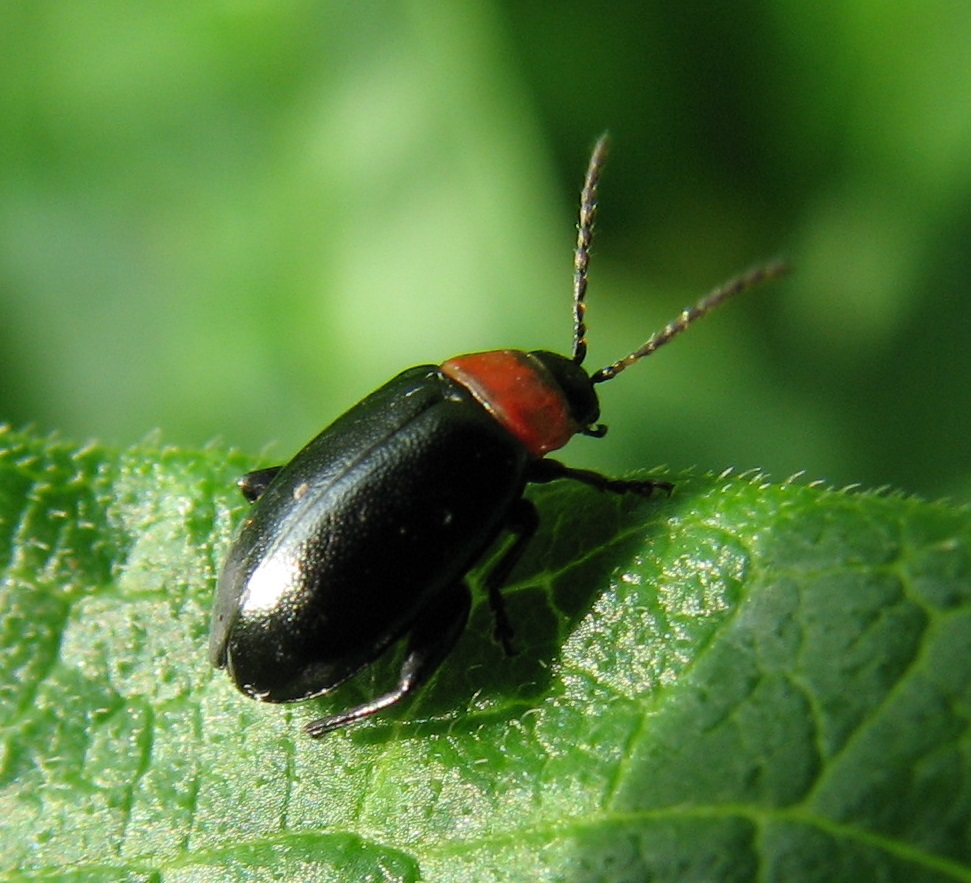
Disonycha xanthomelas

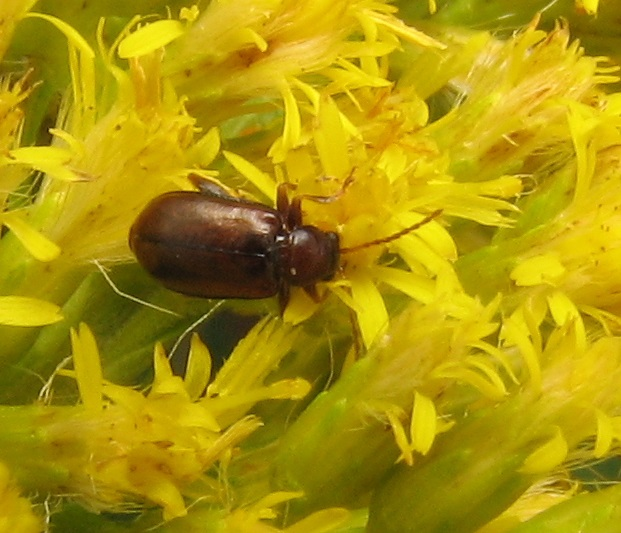
Luperaltica nigripalpis

A flea beetle is any small, jumping beetle of the leaf beetle family (Chrysomelidae) that is part of the tribe Alticini, which is part of the subfamily Galerucinae. Historically the flea beetles were classified as their own subfamily.

Traditionally, the Alticini were separated from other Galerucinae by the presence of jumping hind legs, characterised by enlarged femora containing a spring structure allowing the flea beetles to jump. Recent phylogenetic studies suggest that jumping hind legs evolved multiple times in the Galerucinae, rather than once, and that several genera should be transferred between Alticini and Galerucinae sensu stricto (or Galerucini in some classifications).

== Description and ecology ==
The adults are very small to moderately sized Chrysomelidae (i.e. among beetles in general they are on the smallish side). They are similar to other leaf beetles, but characteristically have the hindleg femora greatly enlarged. These enlarged femora allow for the springing action of these insects when disturbed. The jumping mechanism of flea beetles has been studied extensively. One study looked at several species of flea beetles, including the Altica cirsicola species, and described the jumping mechanism of these beetles to be very efficient. This study even applied the knowledge gained from the flea beetles to create a preliminary design for a bionic leg that can jump. Flea beetles can also walk normally and fly. Many flea beetles are attractively colored; dark, shiny and often metallic colors predominate.

Adult flea beetles feed externally on plants, eating the surface of the leaves, stems and petals. Under heavy feeding the small round holes caused by an individual flea beetle's feeding may coalesce into larger areas of damage. Some flea beetle larvae (e.g. of Phyllotreta species) are root feeders.

In adverse weather conditions (rain, for example) some flea beetles seek shelter in the soil. Some species, such as Phyllotreta cruciferae and P. striolata, prefer to leave their hideouts only during warm and dry weather. The German name Erdflöhe (literally "earth fleas") refers to their jumping ability and this behavior of hiding in the soil.

== Relationship with humans ==
Flea beetles may be beneficial or may be pests, depending on the species.

=== Pest ===
Many major agricultural crops are attacked by flea beetles, including various cruciferous plants such as mustard and rapeseed. Numerous garden plants are also subject to flea beetle feeding, such as flowers of Gardenia and Rothmannia by Altica species.

Flea beetles execute their most severe attacks during dry weather and are most active on sunny days. The larvae are known to chew roots.

==== Companion plant ====
Flea beetles can be deterred by a number of different companion plants, that can be grown intercropped in a garden to benefit neighboring plants. For example, thyme, catnip, and other kinds of mint cover up the scent of nearby plants.

Radishes, on the other hand, can be grown as a trap crop, luring the flea beetles away from more important crops. Since the root isn't harmed by the beetles, they remain useful, themselves.

A number of natural predators can be employed to keep flea beetles in check, including two that parasitize it: braconid wasps and tachinid flies. In both cases, the larval stage feeds on the flea beetle, while the adults feed on nectar and pollen; some species are even important pollinators. To encourage braconid wasps and tachinid flies, some types of flowers can be planted between crops: umbels such as caraway, herb fennel, coriander and Ammi majus, and simple open flowers such as California poppies and pot marigolds, as well as yarrows.

=== Beneficial insect ===
Other flea beetle species are beneficial, feeding on weeds and similar nuisance plants. A few species have even been introduced to various locations as biological control agents against some weeds. One important example is in the control of leafy spurge (Euphorbia virgata), an invasive weed in the United States. It has a toxic latex and is generally avoided by herbivores. Flea beetles of the genus Aphthona have been successfully introduced to control this plant.

== Selected genera ==
This genus list is not complete. It is also partially from ITIS and might include genera placed elsewhere in other sources.

- Acallepitrix J.Bechyné, 1956
- Acrocyum Jacoby, 1885
- Afroaltica Biondi & D'Alessandro, 2007
- Agasicles Jacoby, 1904
- Altica Geoffroy, 1762
- Andersonoplatus Linzmeier & Konstantinov, 2018
- Anthobiodes Weise, 1887
- Aphthona Chevrolat in Dejean, 1836
- Aphthonoides Jacoby, 1885
- Apteropeda Chevrolat in Dejean, 1836
- Argopistes Motschulsky, 1860
- Argopus Fischer von Waldheim, 1824
- Arrhenocoela Foudras, 1861
- Asphaera Duponchel & Chevrolat, 1842
- Aulacothorax Boheman, 1858
- Batophila Foudras, 1860
- Blepharida Chevrolat in Dejean, 1836
- Capraita J.Bechyné, 1957
- Cerataltica Crotch, 1873
- Chaetocnema Stephens, 1831
- Cornulactica Bechyné, 1955
- Crepidodera Chevrolat in Dejean, 1836
- †Crepidocnema Moskeyko et al., 2010
- Derocrepis Weise, 1886
- Dibolia Latreille, 1829
- Disonycha Chevrolat in Dejean, 1836
- Distigmoptera Blake, 1943
- Dysphenges Horn, 1894
- Epitrix Foudras in Mulsant, 1859
- Glenidion H.Clark, 1860
- Glyptina J.L.LeConte, 1859
- Hemiglyptus Horn, 1889
- Hemiphrynus Horn, 1889
- Hermaeophaga Foudras, 1860
- Heyrovskya Madar & Madar, 1968
- Hippuriphila Foudras in Mulsant, 1859
- Hornaltica Barber, 1941
- Kashmirobia Konstantinov & Prathapan, 2006
- Kuschelina J.Bechyné, 1951
- Lanka Maulik, 1926
- Longitarsus Berthold, 1827
- Luperaltica Crotch, 1873
- Lupraea Jacoby, 1885
- Lysathia J.Bechyné, 1957
- Lythraria Bedel, 1897
- Mantura Stephens, 1831
- Margaridisa J.Bechyné, 1958
- Minota Kutschera, 1859
- Mniophila Stephens, 1831
- Mniophilosoma Wollaston, 1854
- Monomacra Chevrolat in Dejean, 1836
- Neocrepidodera Heikertinger, 1911
- Nesaecrepida Blake, 1964
- Nisotra Baly, 1864
- Ochrosis Foudras, 1861
- Oedionychis Latreille, 1829
- Omophoita Chevrolat in Dejean, 1836
- Orestia Chevrolat in Dejean, 1836
- Pachyonychis H.Clark, 1860
- Pachyonychus F.E.Melsheimer, 1847
- Palaeothona Jacoby, 1885
- Parchicola J.Bechyné and B.Springlová de Bechyné, 1975
- Phydanis Horn, 1889
- Phyllotreta Chevrolat in Dejean, 1836
- Podagrica Chevrolat in Dejean, 1836
- Pseudodibolia Jacoby, 1891
- Pseudolampsis Horn, 1889
- Pseudorthygia Csiki in Heikertinger and Csiki, 1940
- Psylliodes Berthold, 1827
- Sphaeroderma Stephens, 1831
- Strabala Chevrolat in Dejean, 1836
- Stuckenbergiana Scherer, 1963
- Syphrea Baly, 1876
- Systena Chevrolat in Dejean, 1836
- Trichaltica Harold, 1876
- Ugandaltica D'Alessandro & Biondi, 2018
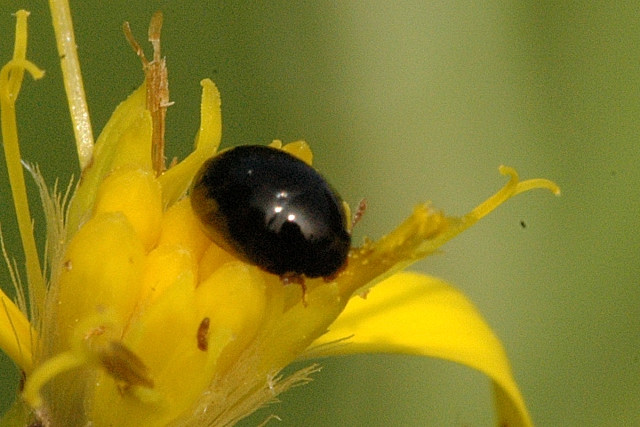
Apteropeda orbiculata

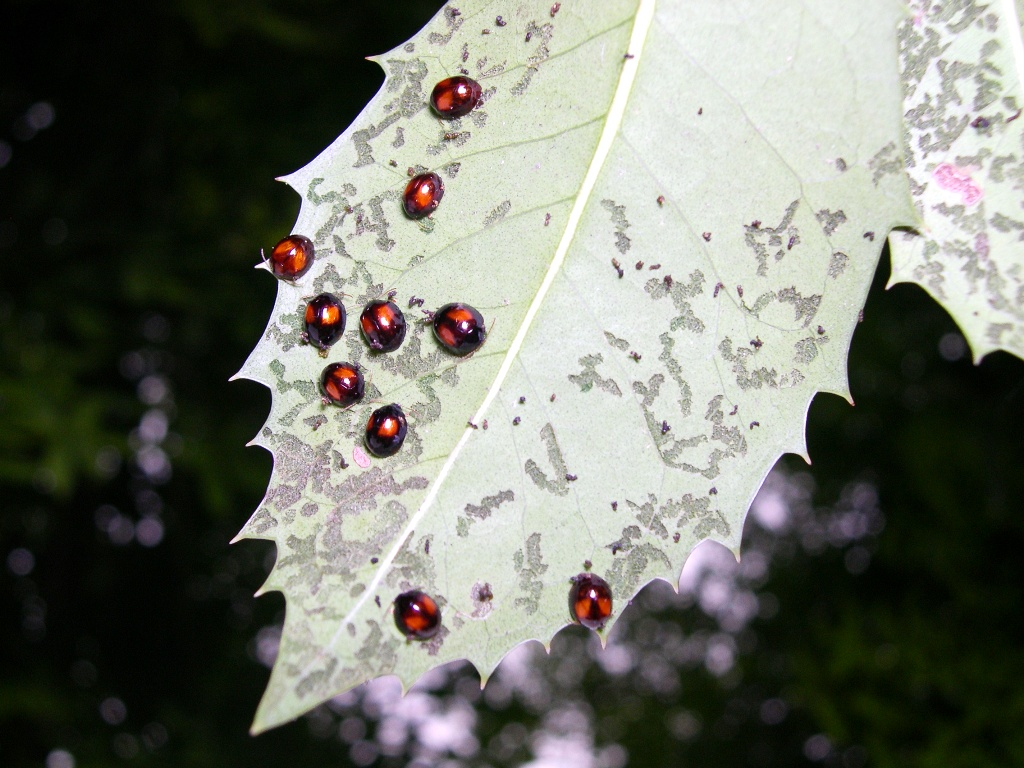
Argopistes coccinelliformis amid feeding damage on Osmanthus × fortunei

Batophila rubi

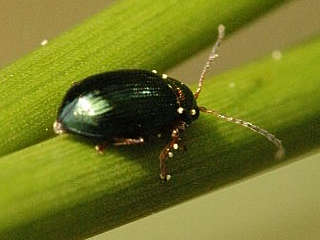
Crepidodera aurata

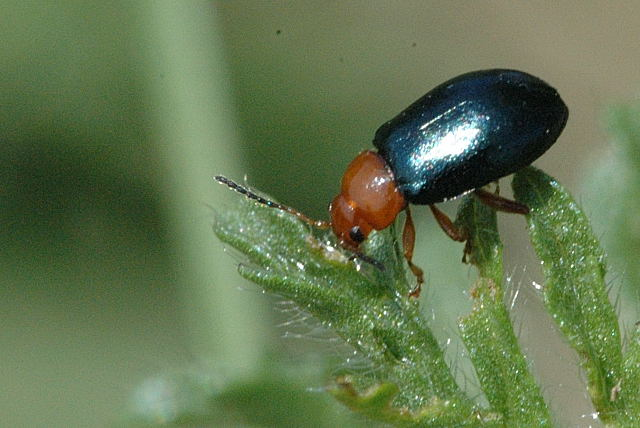
Podagrica fuscicornis

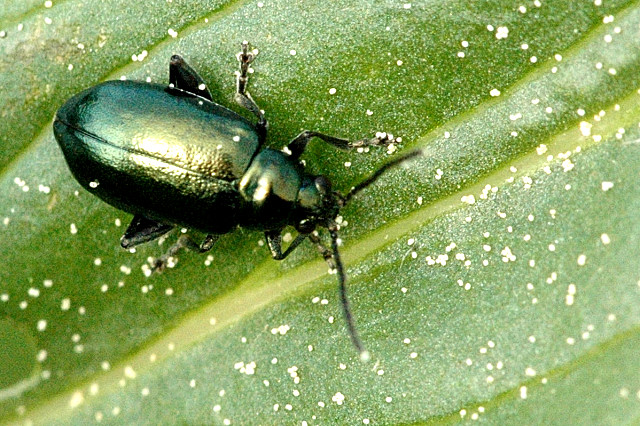
Altica lythri. Note thick hindleg femora

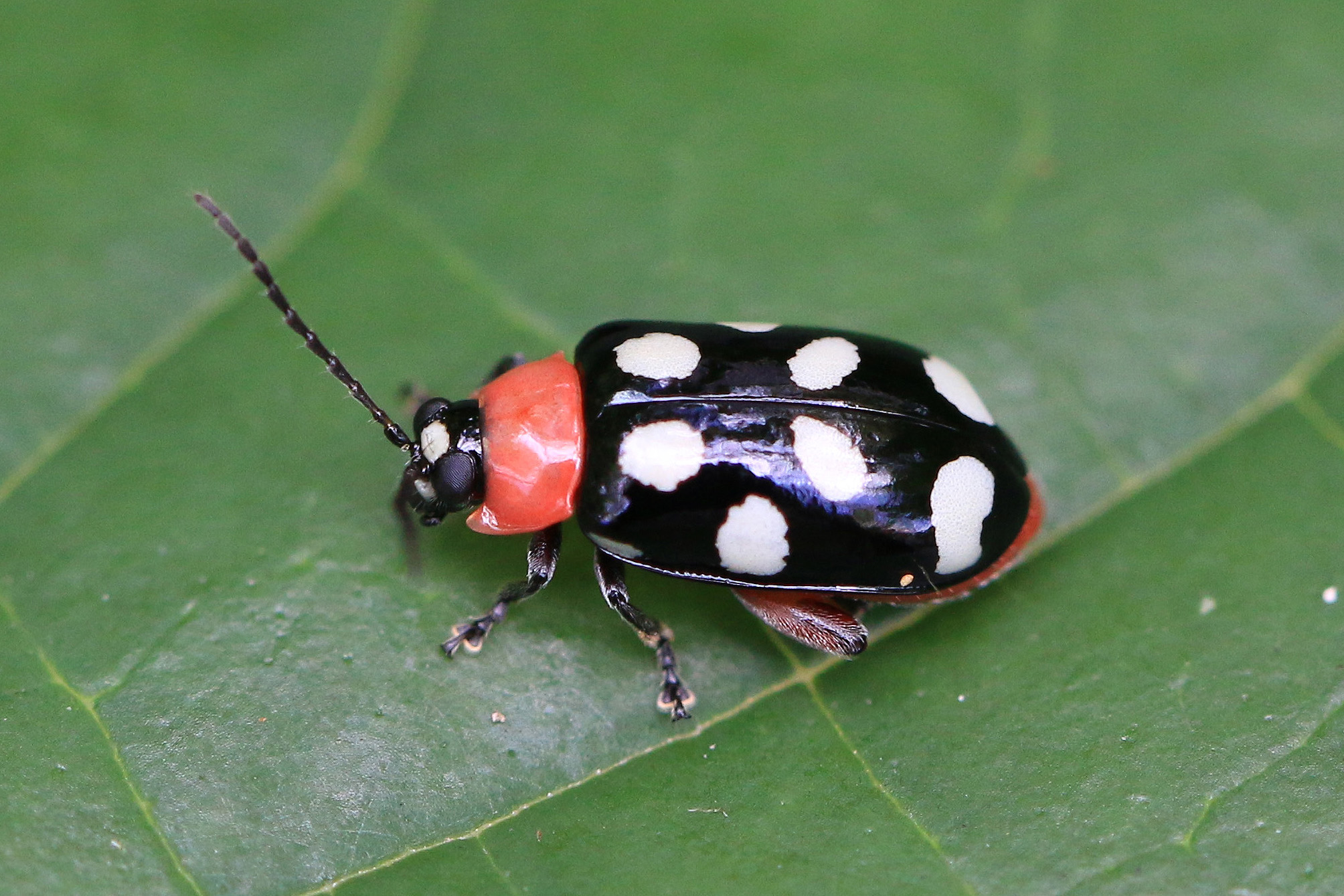
Eight-spotted flea beetle Omophoita cyanipennis

== See also ==
- List of flea beetle genera
