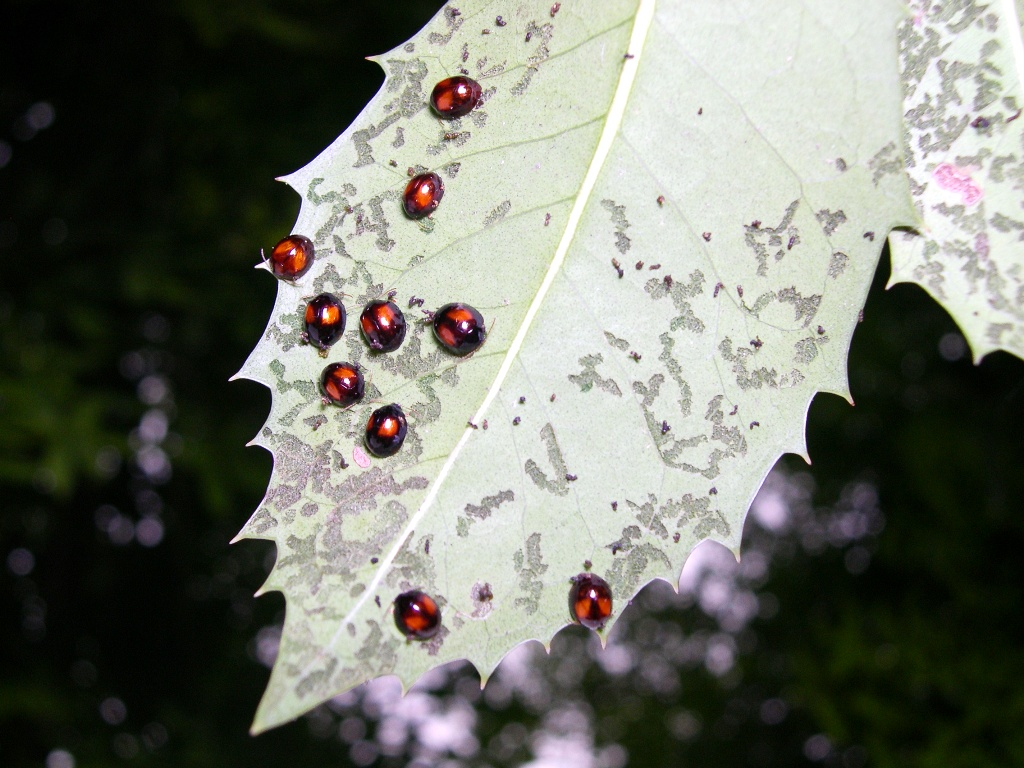
- Argopistes coccinelliformis

Scientific classification
- Kingdom: Animalia
- Phylum: Arthropoda
- Class: Insecta
- Order: Coleoptera
- Suborder: Polyphaga
- Infraorder: Cucujiformia
- Superfamily: Chrysomeloidea
- Family: Chrysomelidae
- Subfamily: Galerucinae
- Tribe: Alticini
- Genus: Argopistes; Motschulsky, 1860

= Argopistes =

Genus of beetles

Argopistes is a genus of flea beetles in the family Chrysomelidae. There are about 50 described species in Argopistes. They are found worldwide.

== Selected species ==
- Argopistes coccinea (Montrouzier, 1861)
- Argopistes coccinelliformis Csiki, 1940
- Argopistes coccinelloides Suffrian
- Argopistes coronatus Blake
- Argopistes dichroa (Montrouzier, 1861)
- Argopistes gagates (Montrouzier, 1861)
- Argopistes gourvesi Samuelson, 1979
- Argopistes kraussi Samuelson, 1973
- Argopistes rubicundus Blake
- Argopistes scyrtoides J. L. LeConte, 1878
- Argopistes thomassini (Montrouzier, 1861)
- Argopistes turnbowi
- Argopistes variabilis Medvedev
- Argopistes woodleyi
