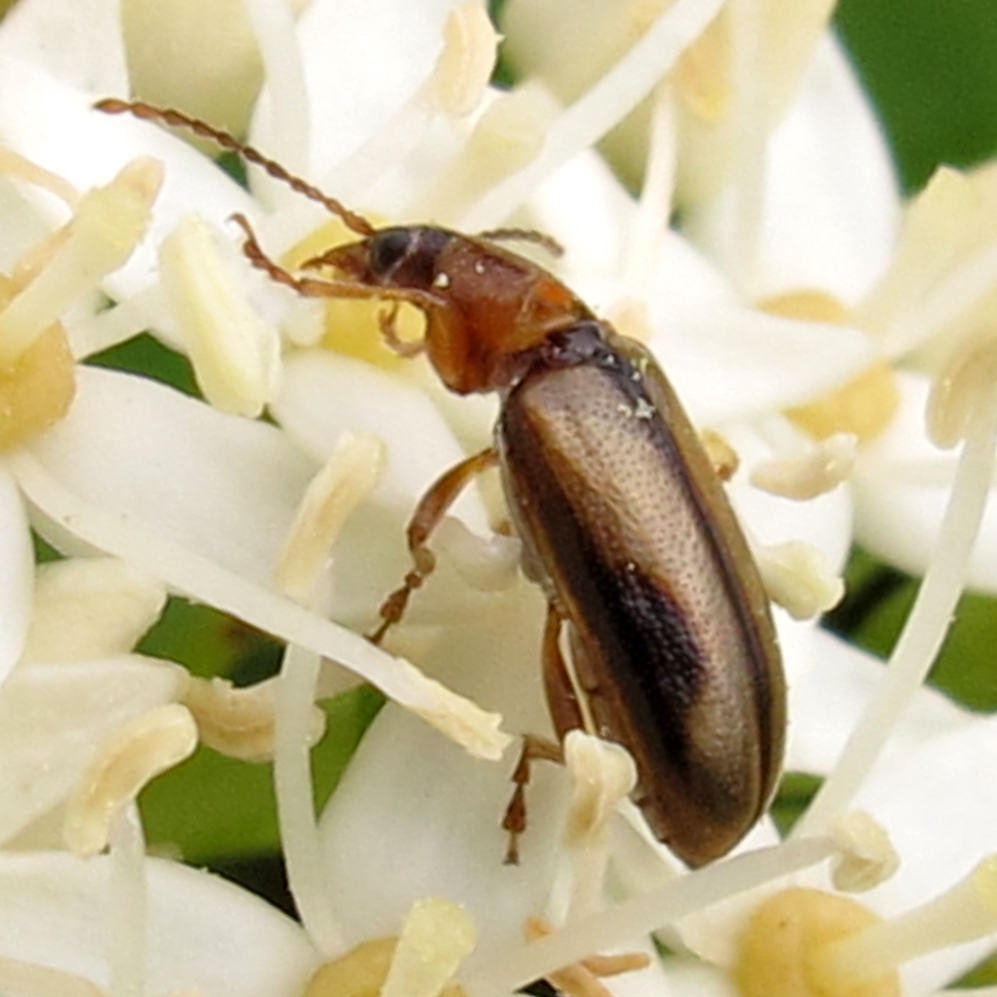

Scientific classification
- Kingdom: Animalia
- Phylum: Arthropoda
- Class: Insecta
- Order: Coleoptera
- Suborder: Polyphaga
- Infraorder: Cucujiformia
- Family: Orsodacnidae
- Genus: Orsodacne
- Species: O. atra

Binomial name
- Orsodacne atra (Ahrens, 1810)

= Orsodacne atra =

Species of beetle

Orsodacne atra is a species of leaf beetle in the family Orsodacnidae. It is found in Central America and North America.
