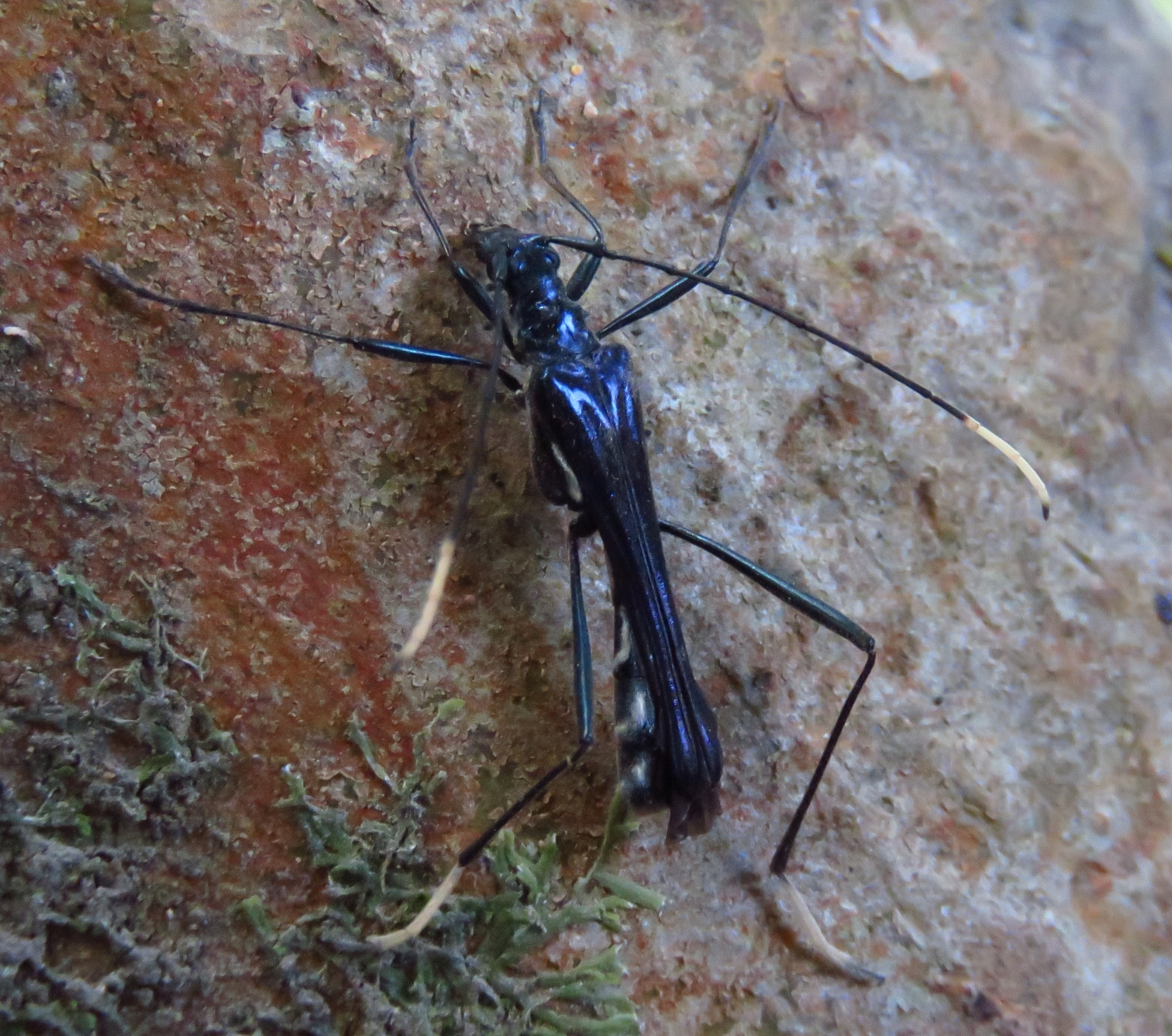
- Stenorhopalus gracilipes, Chile

Scientific classification
- Kingdom: Animalia
- Phylum: Arthropoda
- Class: Insecta
- Order: Coleoptera
- Suborder: Polyphaga
- Infraorder: Cucujiformia
- Superfamily: Chrysomeloidea
- Family: Cerambycidae
- Subfamily: Cerambycinae
- Genus: Stenorhopalus; Blanchard, 1851

= Stenorhopalus =

Genus of beetles

Stenorhopalus is a genus in the longhorn beetle family Cerambycidae. There are about 16 described species in Stenorhopalus, found in Chile and Argentina.

== Species ==
These 16 species belong to the genus Stenorhopalus:

- Stenorhopalus andinus (Cerda, 1968) (Chile)
- Stenorhopalus annulatus (R. Philippi & F. Philippi, 1864) (Chile)
- Stenorhopalus bicolor (R. Philippi, 1865) (Chile)
- Stenorhopalus flavicans (Fairmaire & Germain, 1859) (Chile)
- Stenorhopalus gracilipes (Blanchard, 1851) (Argentina and Chile)
- Stenorhopalus gracilis Blanchard, 1851 (Argentina and Chile)
- Stenorhopalus lepturoides (Blanchard, 1851) (Chile)
- Stenorhopalus macer (Newman, 1840) (Argentina and Chile)
- Stenorhopalus monsalvei (Cerda, 1954) (Chile)
- Stenorhopalus nigriceps (F. Philippi, 1859) (Chile)
- Stenorhopalus opacus (Fairmaire & Germain, 1859) (Chile)
- Stenorhopalus rubriceps (Blanchard, 1851) (Chile)
- Stenorhopalus rufofemoratus (Fairmaire & Germain, 1859) (Chile)
- Stenorhopalus rugosus Fairmaire & Germain, 1861 (Argentina and Chile)
- Stenorhopalus valdiviensis (Cerda, 1995) (Chile)
- Stenorhopalus virescens (Fairmaire & Germain, 1859) (Chile)
