= Mantura (beetle) =

Scientific classification
- Kingdom: Animalia
- Phylum: Arthropoda
- Class: Insecta
- Order: Coleoptera
- Suborder: Polyphaga
- Infraorder: Cucujiformia
- Superfamily: Chrysomeloidea
- Family: Chrysomelidae
- Subfamily: Galerucinae
- Tribe: Alticini
- Genus: Mantura; Stephens, 1831

Genus of beetles

Mantura is a genus of flea beetles in the family Chrysomelidae. There are about 20 described species, from the Nearctic, Palaearctic, and Oriental regions.

== Selected species ==
- Mantura chrysanthemi (Koch, 1803)
- Mantura cylindrica Miller, 1880
- Mantura floridana Crotch, 1873
- Mantura fulvipes Jacoby, 1885
- Mantura horioni Heikertinger, 1940
- Mantura lutea (Allard, 1859)
- Mantura mathewsii (Curtis, 1833)
- Mantura obtusata (Gyllenhal, 1813)
- Mantura pallidicornis (Waltl, 1839)
- Mantura rustica (Linnaeus, 1767)
