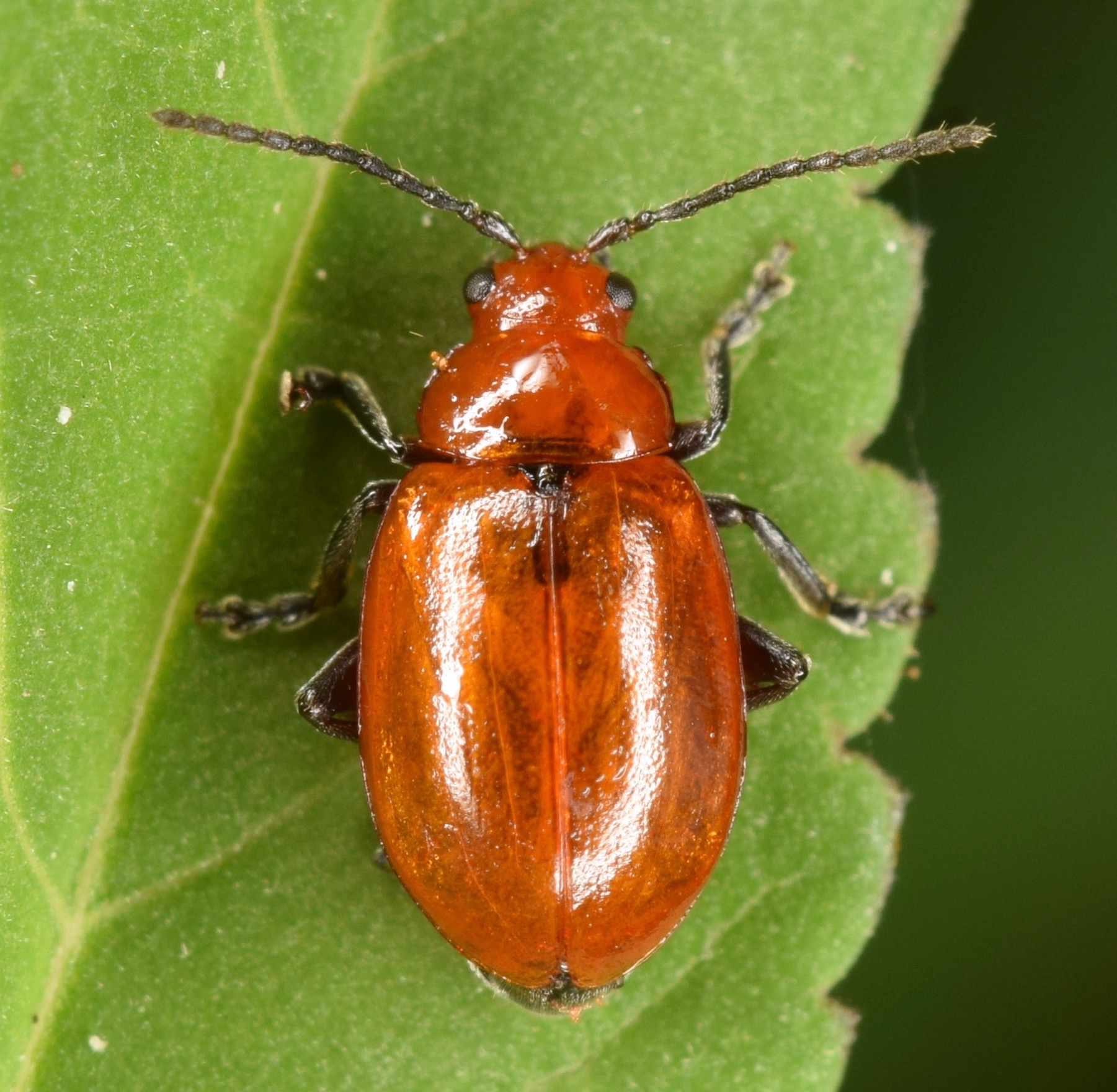

Scientific classification
- Kingdom: Animalia
- Phylum: Arthropoda
- Class: Insecta
- Order: Coleoptera
- Suborder: Polyphaga
- Infraorder: Cucujiformia
- Superfamily: Chrysomeloidea
- Family: Chrysomelidae
- Subfamily: Galerucinae
- Tribe: Alticini
- Genus: Strabala; Chevrolat in Dejean, 1836

= Strabala =

Genus of beetles

Strabala is a genus of flea beetles in the family Chrysomelidae. There are about 30 described species, found in North America and the Neotropics.

== Selected species ==
- Strabala acuminata Blake, 1953
- Strabala ambulans (Suffrian, 1868)
- Strabala colombiana
- Strabala darcelina
- Strabala peri
- Strabala punctigera
- Strabala rotunda Blake, 1953
- Strabala rufa (Illiger, 1807)
- Strabala scutellaris (Olivier, 1908)
- Strabala supposita
- Strabala uruyenica
- Strabala weyrauchi Bechyne
