= Aulacoscelis candezei =

Scientific classification
- Domain: Eukaryota
- Kingdom: Animalia
- Phylum: Arthropoda
- Class: Insecta
- Order: Coleoptera
- Suborder: Polyphaga
- Infraorder: Cucujiformia
- Family: Orsodacnidae
- Genus: Aulacoscelis
- Species: A. candezei

Binomial name
- Aulacoscelis candezei Chapuis, 1874

Species of beetle

Aulacoscelis candezei is a species of leaf beetle in the family Orsodacnidae. It is found in Central America and North America.
