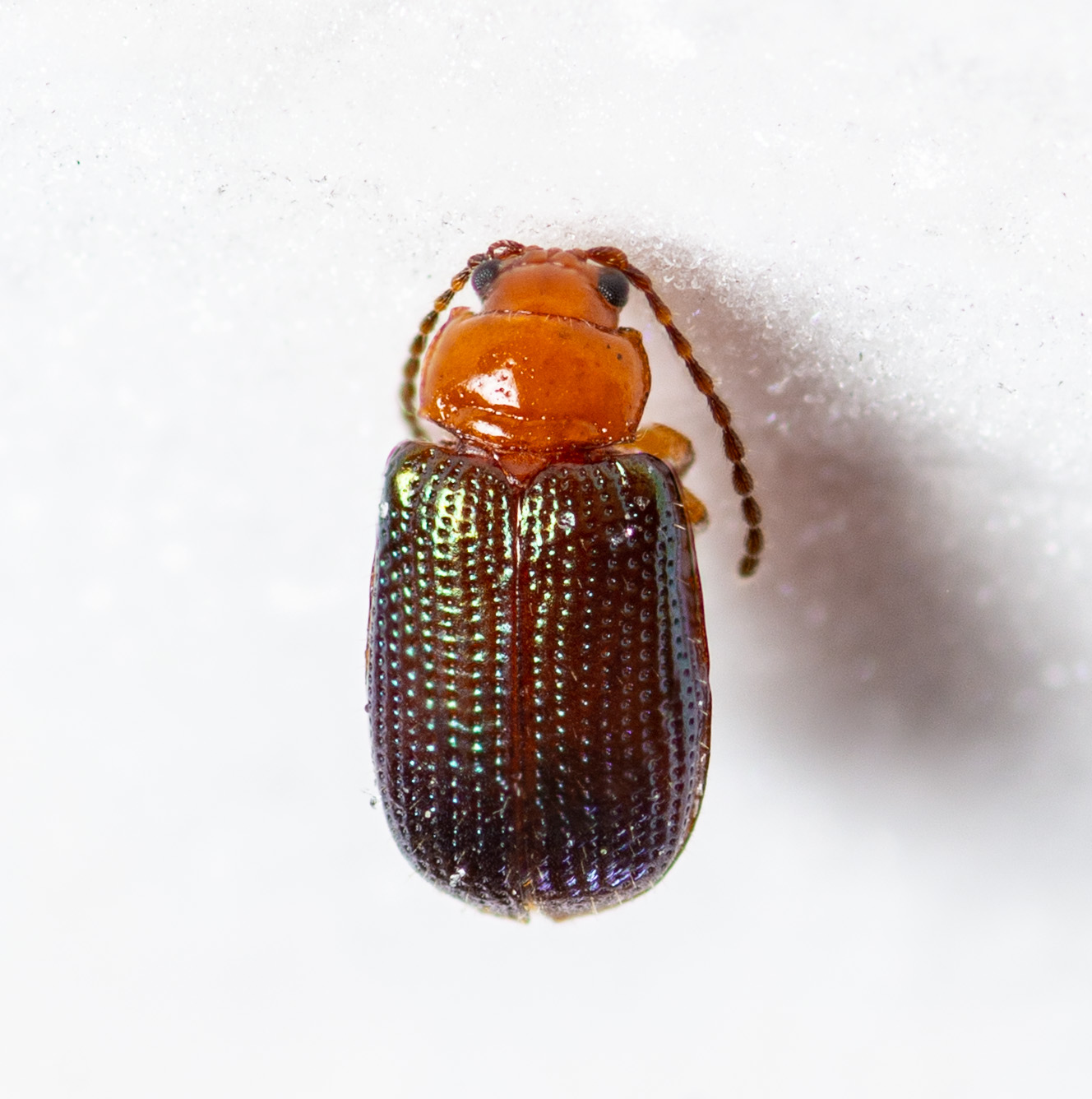
- Trichaltica scabricula

Scientific classification
- Kingdom: Animalia
- Phylum: Arthropoda
- Class: Insecta
- Order: Coleoptera
- Suborder: Polyphaga
- Infraorder: Cucujiformia
- Superfamily: Chrysomeloidea
- Family: Chrysomelidae
- Subfamily: Galerucinae
- Tribe: Alticini
- Genus: Trichaltica; Harold, 1876

Synonyms
- Hoplacerus Jacoby, 1892

= Trichaltica =

Genus of beetles

Trichaltica is a genus of flea beetles in the family Chrysomelidae. There are some 30 described species, found in North America and the Neotropics.

== Selected species ==
- Trichaltica scabricula (Crotch, 1873)
- Trichaltica tibialis (Jacoby, 1892)
- Trichaltica virescens Schaeffer
- Trichaltica xantholimbia (Bechyné)
