= Monomacra =

Scientific classification
- Kingdom: Animalia
- Phylum: Arthropoda
- Class: Insecta
- Order: Coleoptera
- Suborder: Polyphaga
- Infraorder: Cucujiformia
- Superfamily: Chrysomeloidea
- Family: Chrysomelidae
- Subfamily: Galerucinae
- Tribe: Alticini
- Genus: Monomacra; Chevrolat in Dejean, 1836

Genus of beetles

Monomacra is a genus of flea beetles in the family Chrysomelidae. There are some 120 species, from the Nearctic and Neotropics.

== Species ==
- Monomacra andreinii Bechyné, 1957
- Monomacra azureipennis
- Monomacra bumeliae (Schaeffer, 1905)
- Monomacra carinata Jacoby, 1902
- Monomacra corallina (Fleutiaux & Sallé, 1889)
- Monomacra dagoberta
- Monomacra dixira
- Monomacra elongata (Jacoby, 1884)
- Monomacra guadeloupensis Bechyné, 1956
- Monomacra guazapa
- Monomacra opaca Wilcox, 1953
- Monomacra sesquifasciata
- Monomacra sinusops
- Monomacra sponsa Clark, 1865
- Monomacra violaceipennis
- Monomacra xanthosoma
- Monomacra yepezi
