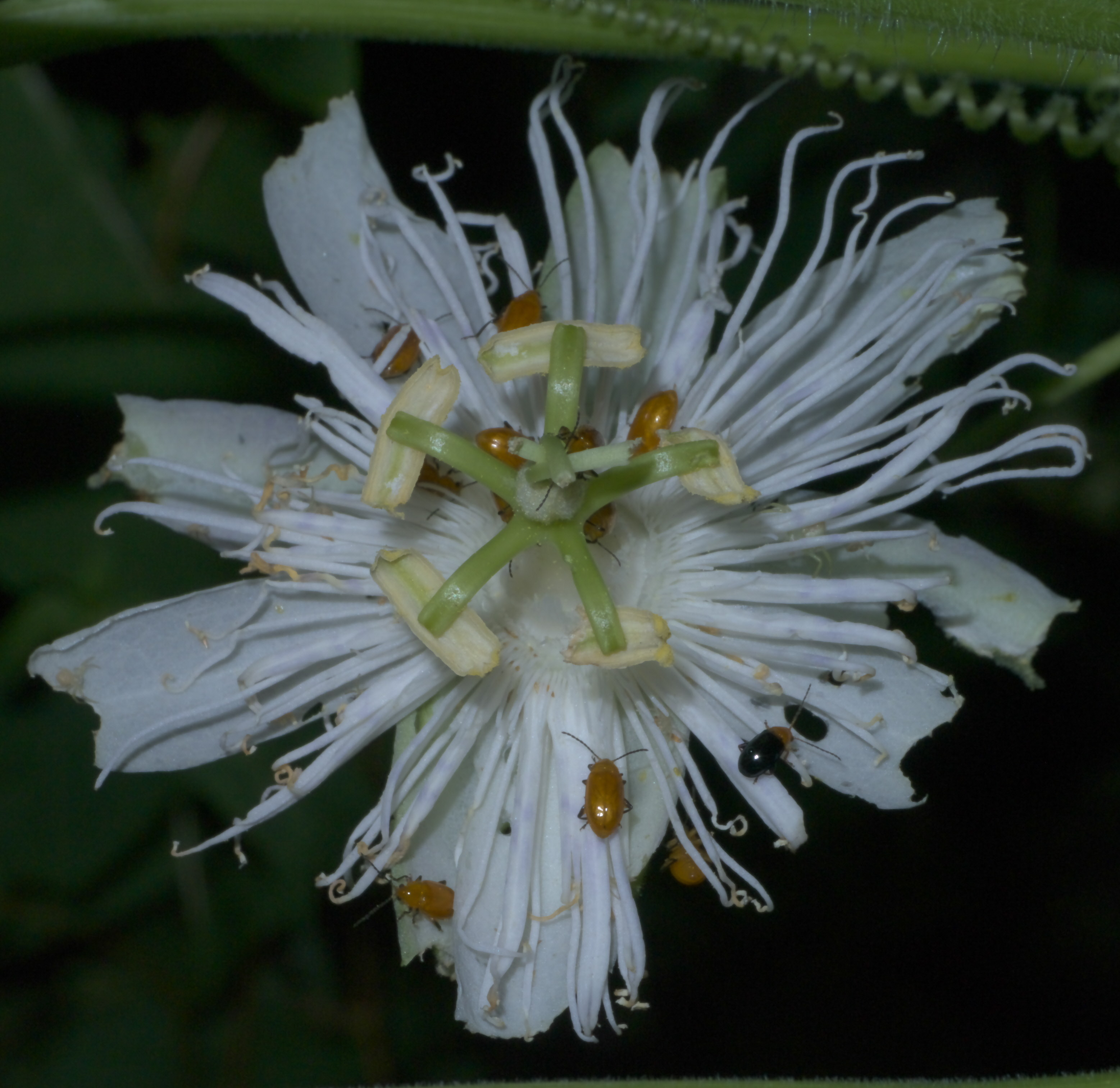

Scientific classification
- Kingdom: Animalia
- Phylum: Arthropoda
- Class: Insecta
- Order: Coleoptera
- Suborder: Polyphaga
- Infraorder: Cucujiformia
- Superfamily: Chrysomeloidea
- Family: Chrysomelidae
- Subfamily: Galerucinae
- Tribe: Alticini
- Genus: Parchicola; J. Bechyné & B. Springlová de Bechyné, 1975

= Parchicola =

Genus of beetles

Parchicola is a genus of flea beetles in the family Chrysomelidae. There are at least 4 described species, found in North America and the Neotropics.

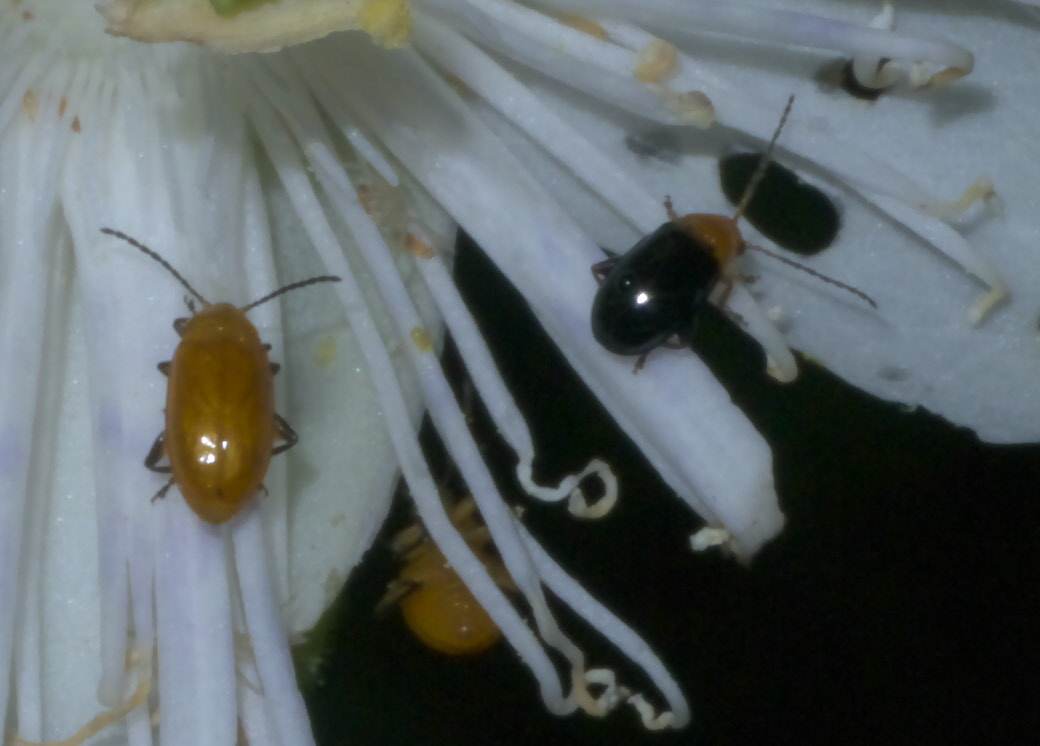

== Selected species ==
- Parchicola androsensis (Blake 1946)
- Parchicola iris (Olivier, 1808)
- Parchicola religata (Jacquelin du Val 1857)
- Parchicola tibialis (Olivier, 1808)
