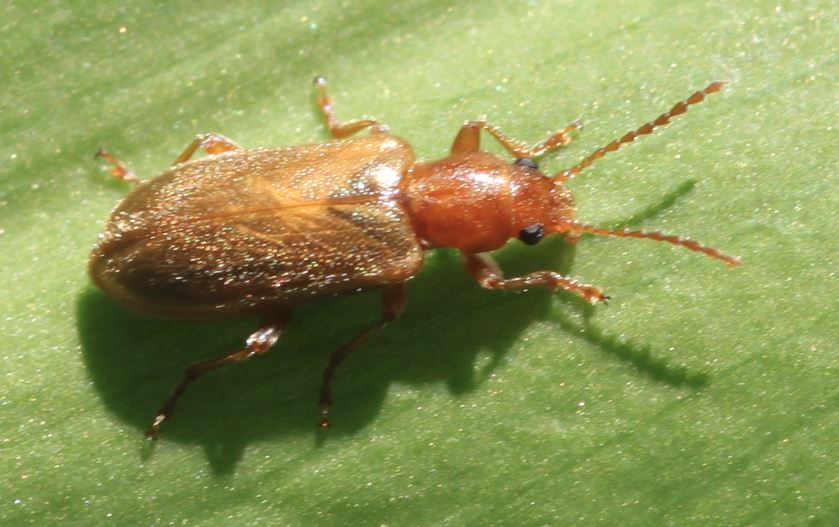

Scientific classification
- Kingdom: Animalia
- Phylum: Arthropoda
- Class: Insecta
- Order: Coleoptera
- Suborder: Polyphaga
- Infraorder: Cucujiformia
- Family: Orsodacnidae
- Genus: Orsodacne
- Species: O. humeralis

Binomial name
- Orsodacne humeralis Latreille, 1804

Synonyms
- List: Crioceris lineola Panzer, 1795 (junior homonym); Orsodacna nigriceps Latreille, 1807; Orsodacna nigricollis Olivier, 1808; Orsodacne coerulescens Duftschmid, 1825; Orsodacne marginella Duftschmid, 1825; Orsodacne picipennis Duftschmid, 1825; Orsodacna violacea Chevrolat, 1833; Orsodacna mespili Lacordaire, 1845; Orsodacna nematoides Lacordaire, 1845; Orsodacna variabilis Baly, 1877; Orsodacna lineola var. croatica Weise, 1883; Orsodacne ruficollis Pic, 1894; Orsodacne ruficollis var. delagrangei Pic, 1896; Orsodacne ruficollis var. syriaca Pic, 1896; Orsodacne lineola var. flava Csiki, 1899; Orsodacne lineola var. marginata Csiki, 1899; Orsodacne lineola ab. brancsiki Laczó, 1909; Orsodacne lineola var. hispanica Pic, 1913; Orsodacne lineola var. kraatzi Pic, 1913; Orsodacne lineola var. anatolica Pic, 1916; Orsodacna lineola var. innotatipennis Pic, 1941; Orsodacna lineola var. luteoapicalis Pic, 1941; Orsodacna lineola var. graeca Pic, 1941; Orsodacna lineola var. luteonotata Pic, 1941; Orsodacne lineola f. marginalis Roubal, 1941; Orsodacne lineola ab. suturata Csiki, 1953

= Orsodacne humeralis =

Species of beetle

Orsodacne humeralis is a species of beetle found in Eurasia.

== Description ==
O. humeralis is 4-7 mm long, similar in appearance to other species of the genus, having fairly long antennae with a slightly hairy body. The colour varies from black or dark blue to pale yellow.

== Feeding ==
Orsodacne humeralis feeds on nectar and pollen.
