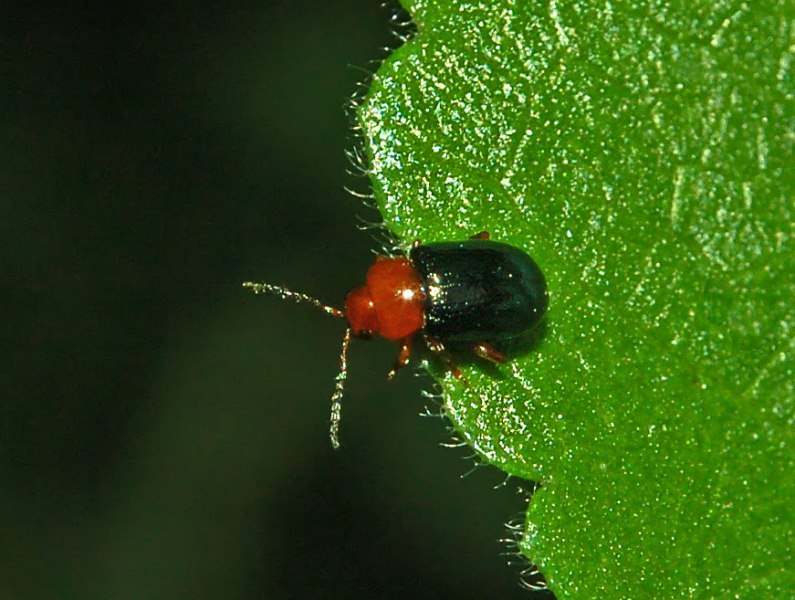
- Podagrica malvae

Scientific classification
- Kingdom: Animalia
- Phylum: Arthropoda
- Class: Insecta
- Order: Coleoptera
- Suborder: Polyphaga
- Infraorder: Cucujiformia
- Superfamily: Chrysomeloidea
- Family: Chrysomelidae
- Subfamily: Galerucinae
- Tribe: Alticini
- Genus: Podagrica; Chevrolat, 1836

Synonyms
- Neumannia Weise, 1907; Podagricina Csiki, 1940; Podagrixena Bechyne, 1968

= Podagrica =

Genus of beetles

Podagrica is a genus of flea beetles belonging to the family Chrysomelidae. There are some 55 species in the Palaearctic, Oriental, and Afrotropical regions.

== Selected species ==
- Podagrica atlantica Heikertinger, 1951
- Podagrica audisioi Biondi, 1982
- Podagrica fuscicornis (Linnaeus, 1766)
- Podagrica fuscipes (Fabricius, 1775)
- Podagrica malvae (Illiger, 1807)
- Podagrica menetriesi (Faldermann, 1837)
- Podagrica pallidicolor Pic, 1909
