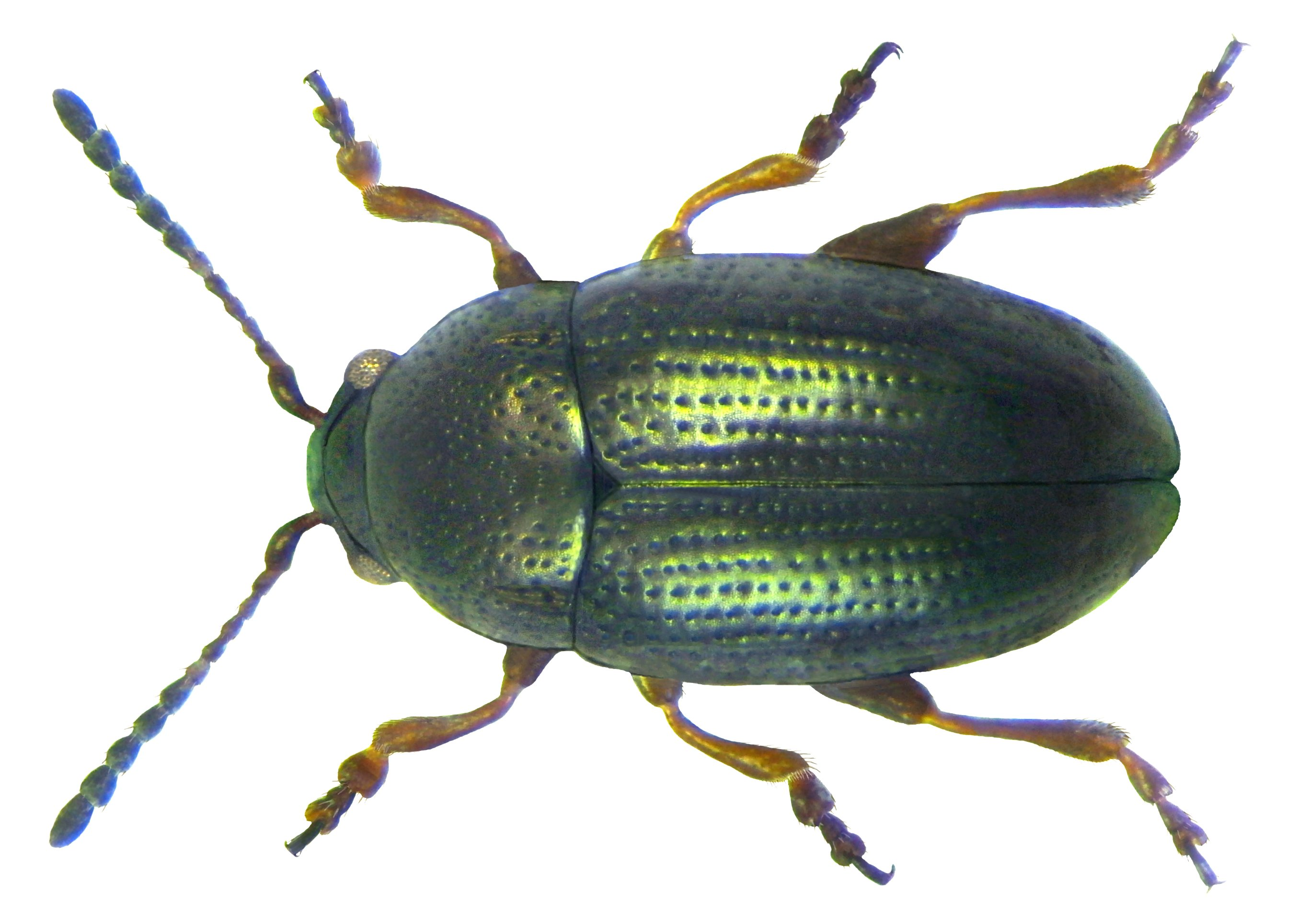

Scientific classification
- Kingdom: Animalia
- Phylum: Arthropoda
- Class: Insecta
- Order: Coleoptera
- Suborder: Polyphaga
- Infraorder: Cucujiformia
- Family: Chrysomelidae
- Genus: Mantura
- Species: M. obtusata

Binomial name
- Mantura obtusata (Gyllenhaal, 1813)

= Mantura obtusata =

Species of beetle

Mantura obtusata is a species of beetle in the family Chrysomelidae. It can be found in most of Europe.
