= Stenorhopalus nigriceps =

Scientific classification
- Domain: Eukaryota
- Kingdom: Animalia
- Phylum: Arthropoda
- Class: Insecta
- Order: Coleoptera
- Suborder: Polyphaga
- Infraorder: Cucujiformia
- Family: Cerambycidae
- Genus: Stenorhopalus
- Species: S. nigriceps

Binomial name
- Stenorhopalus nigriceps (Philippi, 1859)

Species of beetle

Stenorhopalus nigriceps is a species of beetle in the family Cerambycidae. It was described by Rodolfo Amando Philippi in 1859.
