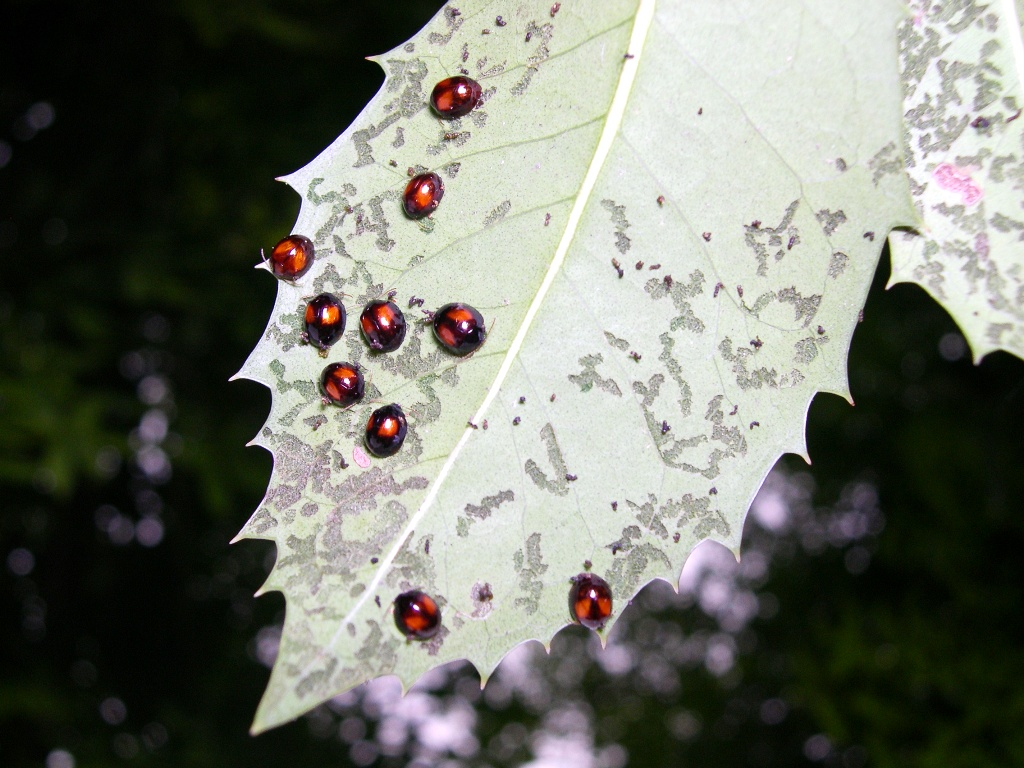
- A. coccinellifornis

Scientific classification
- Kingdom: Animalia
- Phylum: Arthropoda
- Class: Insecta
- Order: Coleoptera
- Suborder: Polyphaga
- Infraorder: Cucujiformia
- Family: Chrysomelidae
- Tribe: Alticini
- Genus: Argopistes
- Species: A. scyrtoides

Binomial name
- Argopistes scyrtoides J. L. LeConte, 1878

= Argopistes scyrtoides =

Species of beetle

Argopistes scyrtoides is a species of flea beetle in the family Chrysomelidae. It is found in North America.
