= Parchicola iris =

Scientific classification
- Kingdom: Animalia
- Phylum: Arthropoda
- Class: Insecta
- Order: Coleoptera
- Suborder: Polyphaga
- Infraorder: Cucujiformia
- Family: Chrysomelidae
- Genus: Parchicola
- Species: P. iris

Binomial name
- Parchicola iris (Olivier, 1808)

Species of beetle

Parchicola iris is a species of flea beetle in the family Chrysomelidae. It is found in North America.
