= Trichaltica tibialis =

Scientific classification
- Kingdom: Animalia
- Phylum: Arthropoda
- Class: Insecta
- Order: Coleoptera
- Suborder: Polyphaga
- Infraorder: Cucujiformia
- Family: Chrysomelidae
- Tribe: Alticini
- Genus: Trichaltica
- Species: T. tibialis

Binomial name
- Trichaltica tibialis (Jacoby, 1892)

Species of beetle

Trichaltica tibialis is a species of flea beetle in the family Chrysomelidae.
