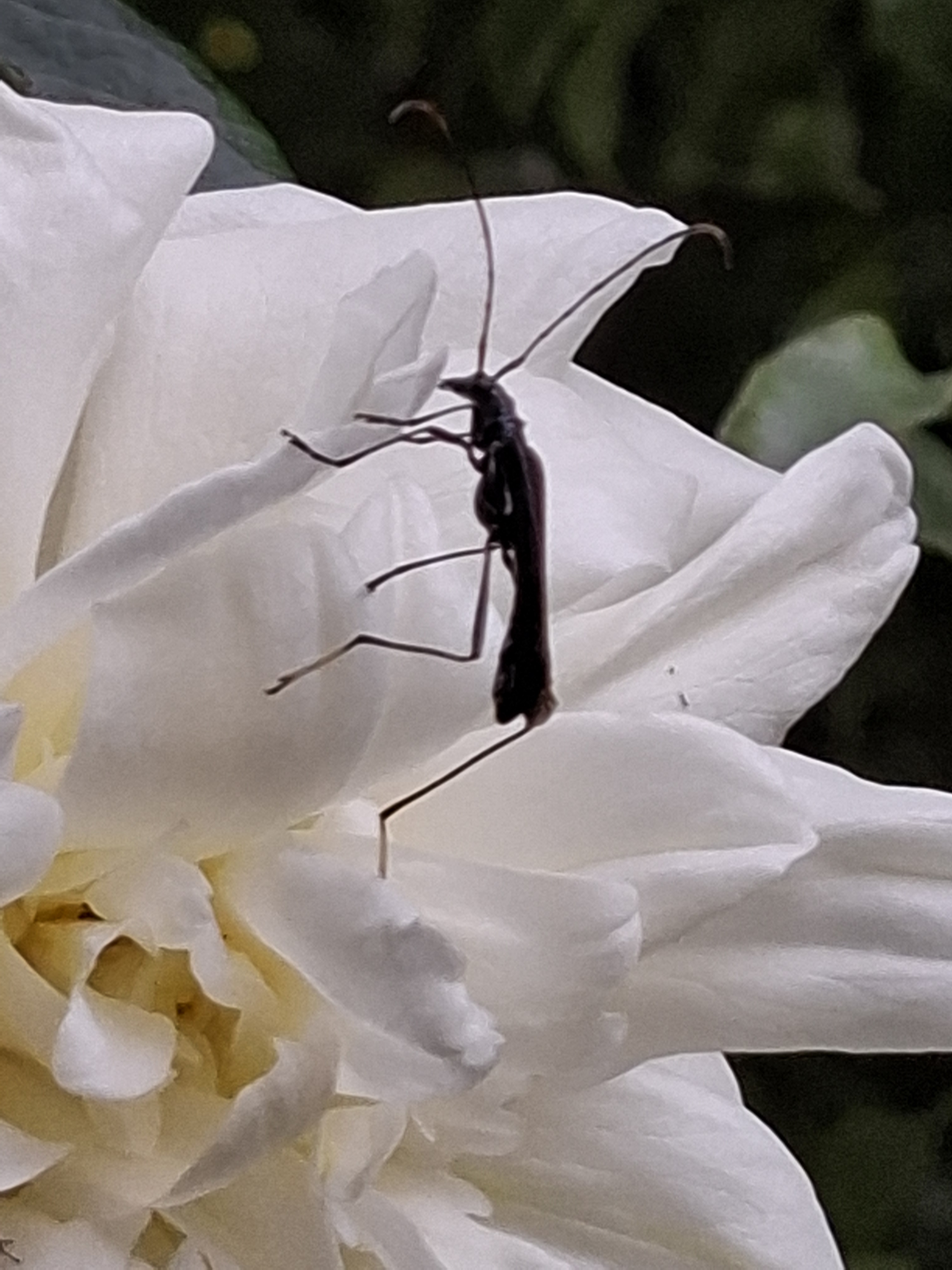

Scientific classification
- Domain: Eukaryota
- Kingdom: Animalia
- Phylum: Arthropoda
- Class: Insecta
- Order: Coleoptera
- Suborder: Polyphaga
- Infraorder: Cucujiformia
- Family: Cerambycidae
- Genus: Stenorhopalus
- Species: S. gracilipes

Binomial name
- Stenorhopalus gracilipes (Blanchard, 1851)

= Stenorhopalus gracilipes =

Species of beetle

Stenorhopalus gracilipes is a species of beetle in the family Cerambycidae. It was described by Émile Blanchard in 1851.
