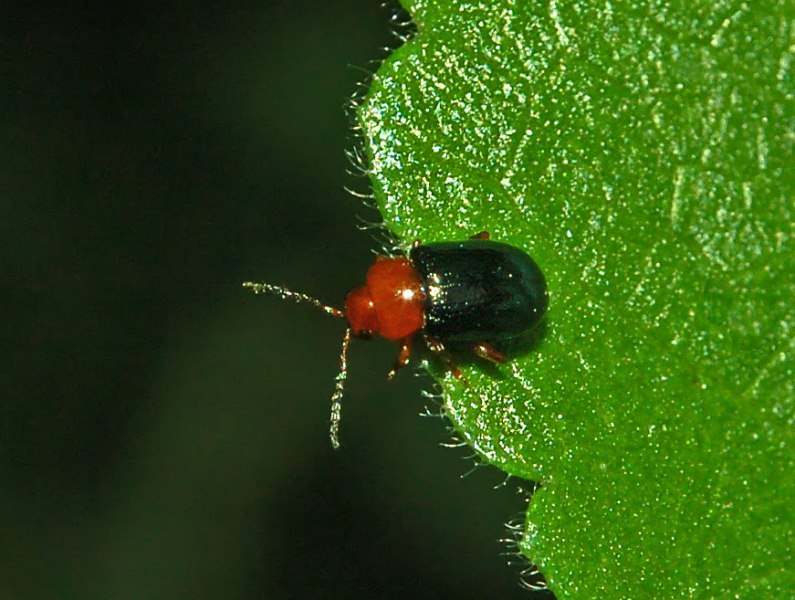

Scientific classification
- Kingdom: Animalia
- Phylum: Arthropoda
- Class: Insecta
- Order: Coleoptera
- Suborder: Polyphaga
- Infraorder: Cucujiformia
- Family: Chrysomelidae
- Genus: Podagrica
- Species: P. malvae

Binomial name
- Podagrica malvae (Illiger, 1807)

Synonyms
- Crepidodera semirufa Kuester, 1847; Haltica intermedia Kutschera, 1860; Haltica malvae Illiger, 1807; Haltica saracena Reiche, 1858; Podagrica italica Allard, 1860; Podagrica laevis Abeille, 1895; Podagrica rufa Allard, 1884; Podagrica unicolor Marseul, 1869

= Podagrica malvae =

Species of beetle

Podagrica malvae is a species of skeletonising leaf beetles belonging to the family Chrysomelidae, subfamily Galerucinae.

This leaf beetle lives in Southern and Central Europe, in the eastern Palearctic realm, in the Near East, and in the North Africa.

The adults are 3–4 millimetres (0.12–0.16 in) long. The colours of the elytra of this beetle are dark blue, while pronotum, head and legs are reddish.

They feed on various Malvaceae species.
