= Strabala acuminata =

Scientific classification
- Kingdom: Animalia
- Phylum: Arthropoda
- Class: Insecta
- Order: Coleoptera
- Suborder: Polyphaga
- Infraorder: Cucujiformia
- Family: Chrysomelidae
- Tribe: Alticini
- Genus: Strabala
- Species: S. acuminata

Binomial name
- Strabala acuminata Blake, 1953

Species of beetle

Strabala acuminata is a species of flea beetle in the family Chrysomelidae. It is found in North America.

== Subspecies ==
These two subspecies belong to the species Strabala acuminata:

- Strabala acuminata acuminata Blake, 1953
- Strabala acuminata costaricensis Blake
