= Stenorhopalus andinus =

Scientific classification
- Domain: Eukaryota
- Kingdom: Animalia
- Phylum: Arthropoda
- Class: Insecta
- Order: Coleoptera
- Suborder: Polyphaga
- Infraorder: Cucujiformia
- Family: Cerambycidae
- Subfamily: Cerambycinae
- Genus: Stenorhopalus
- Species: S. andinus

Binomial name
- Stenorhopalus andinus (Cerda, 1968)

Synonyms
- Platynocera andina Monné & Giesbert, 1994

Species of beetle

Stenorhopalus andinus is a species in the longhorn beetle family Cerambycidae. It is native to Chile.
