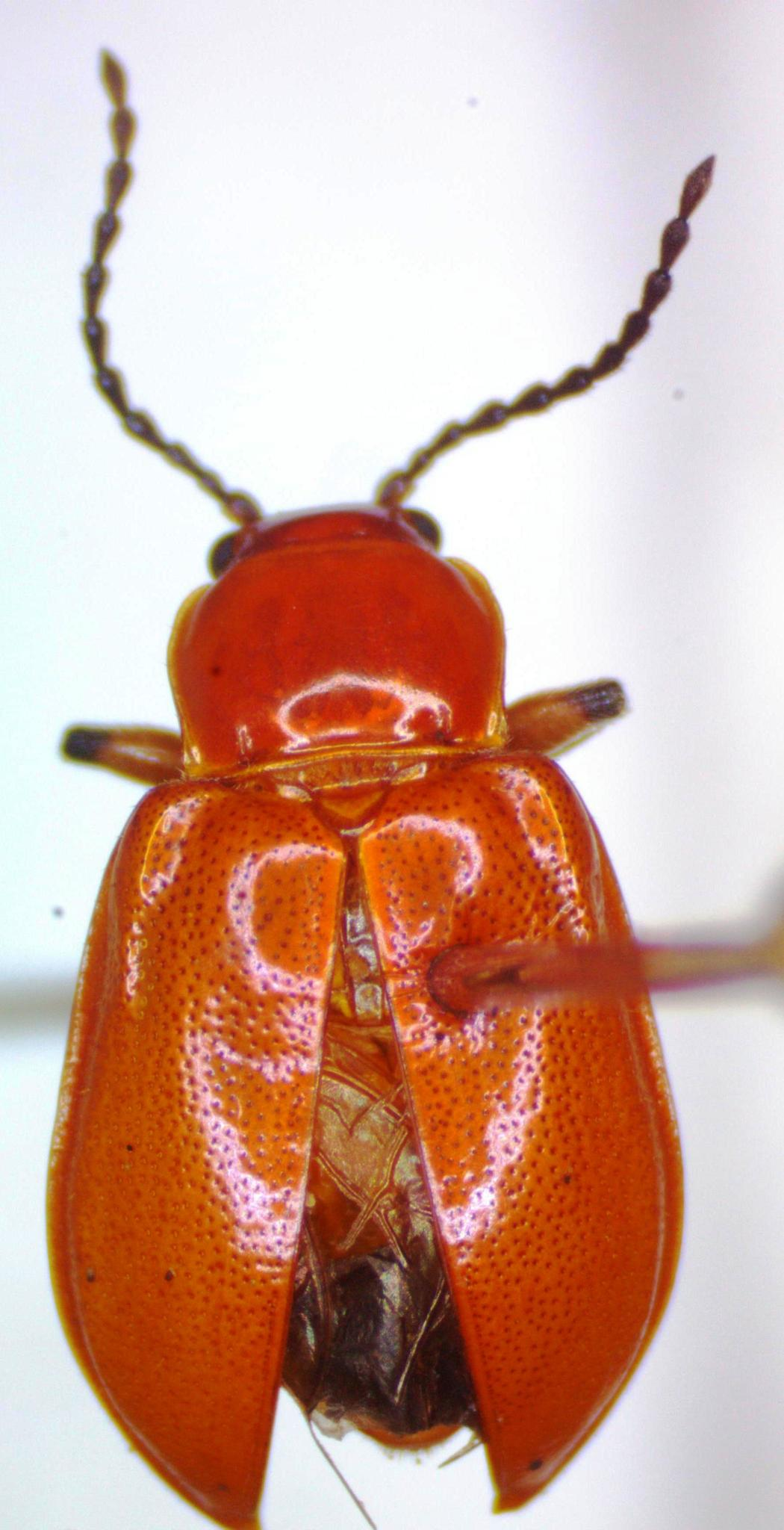
- Aulacoscelis melanocera

Scientific classification
- Domain: Eukaryota
- Kingdom: Animalia
- Phylum: Arthropoda
- Class: Insecta
- Order: Coleoptera
- Suborder: Polyphaga
- Infraorder: Cucujiformia
- Family: Orsodacnidae
- Subfamily: Aulacoscelidinae

Genera
- Aulacoscelis; Janbechynea

= Aulacoscelidinae =

Subfamily of beetles

The beetle subfamily Aulacoscelidinae (sometimes misspelled "Aulacoscelinae") is a small, uncommonly-encountered group presently classified within the family Orsodacnidae, historically placed as a subfamily of Chrysomelidae, or sometimes classified as a separate family Aulacoscelidae. There are only 19 species, mostly Neotropical in distribution, and their larval habits are unknown.
