= Stenorhopalus virescens =

Scientific classification
- Kingdom: Animalia
- Phylum: Arthropoda
- Class: Insecta
- Order: Coleoptera
- Suborder: Polyphaga
- Infraorder: Cucujiformia
- Family: Cerambycidae
- Genus: Stenorhopalus
- Species: S. virescens

Binomial name
- Stenorhopalus virescens (Fairmaire & Germain, 1859)

Species of beetle

Stenorhopalus virescens is a species of beetle in the family Cerambycidae. It was described by Fairmaire & Germain in 1859.
