= Stenorhopalus rufofemoratus =

Scientific classification
- Kingdom: Animalia
- Phylum: Arthropoda
- Class: Insecta
- Order: Coleoptera
- Suborder: Polyphaga
- Infraorder: Cucujiformia
- Family: Cerambycidae
- Subfamily: Cerambycinae
- Genus: Stenorhopalus
- Species: S. rufofemoratus

Binomial name
- Stenorhopalus rufofemoratus (Fairmaire & Germain, 1859)

Synonyms
- Hephaestion rufofemoratus Fairmaire & Germain, 1859; Platynocera rufofemorata Aurivillius, 1912; Stenorrhopalus rufofemoratus F.Philippi, 1887

Species of beetle

Stenorhopalus rufofemoratus is a species in the longhorn beetle family Cerambycidae. It is native to Chile.
