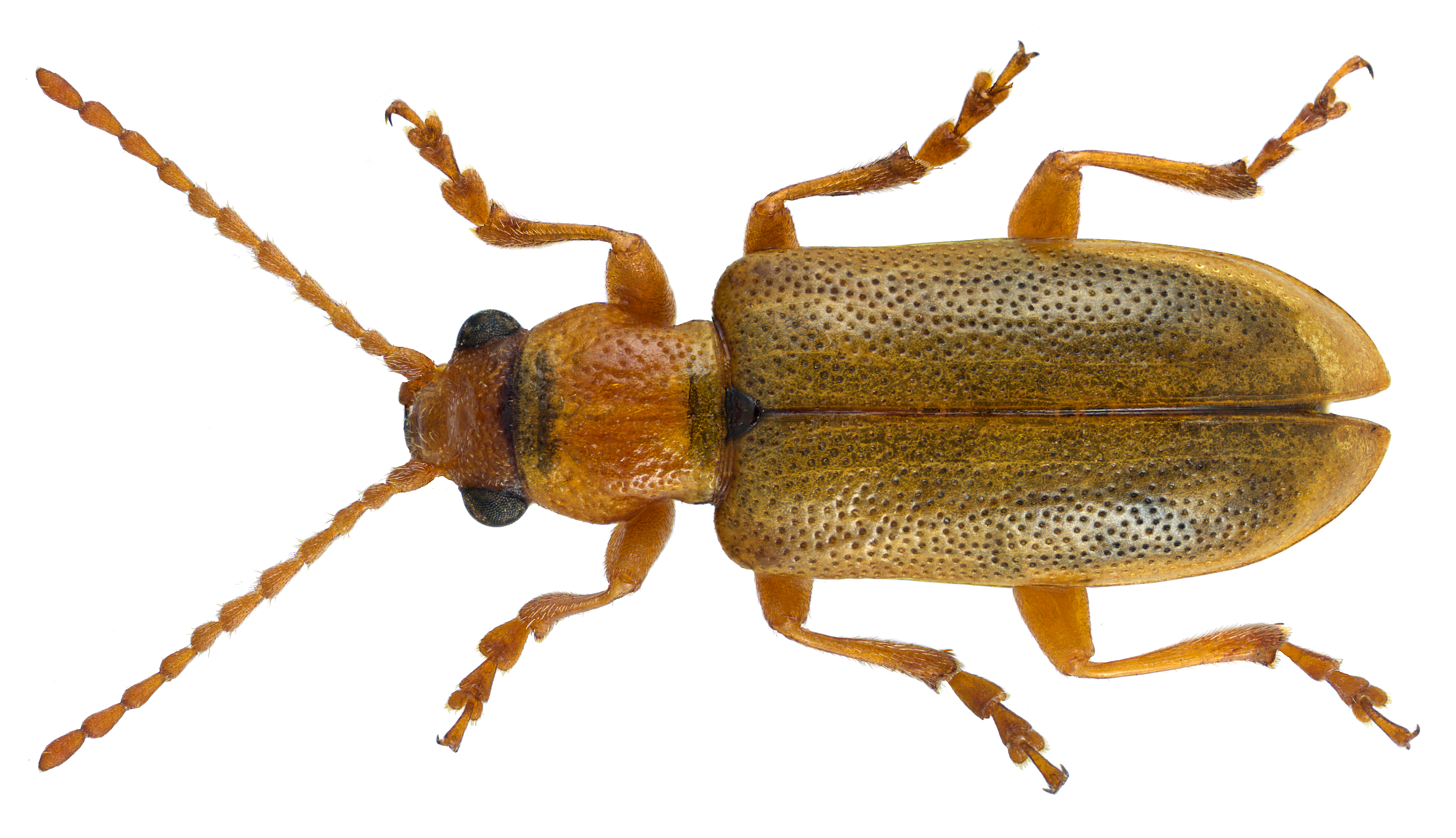
- Orsodacne cerasi

Scientific classification
- Kingdom: Animalia
- Phylum: Arthropoda
- Class: Insecta
- Order: Coleoptera
- Suborder: Polyphaga
- Infraorder: Cucujiformia
- Family: Orsodacnidae
- Subfamily: Orsodacninae; Thomson, 1859
- Genus: Orsodacne; Latreille, 1802

Synonyms
- Orsodacna Latreille, 1804

= Orsodacne =

Genus of beetles

Orsodacne is a genus of beetles, the sole member of the subfamily Orsodacninae. It comprises about 10 Holarctic species.

== List of species ==
- Orsodacne arakii Chûjô, 1942 – Japan
- Orsodacne atra (Ahrens, 1810) – North America
- Orsodacne cerasi (Linnaeus, 1758) – Europe, Asia
- Orsodacne humeralis Latreille, 1804 – Europe, Asia
- Orsodacne mesopotamica Legalov, 2022 – Iraq
- Orsodacne yunnanica Legalov, 2021 – China (Yunnan)
