= Janbechynea =

Scientific classification
- Domain: Eukaryota
- Kingdom: Animalia
- Phylum: Arthropoda
- Class: Insecta
- Order: Coleoptera
- Suborder: Polyphaga
- Infraorder: Cucujiformia
- Family: Orsodacnidae
- Subfamily: Aulacoscelidinae
- Genus: Janbechynea; Monrós, 1953

Type species
- Janbechynea paradoxa Monrós, 1953

Genus of beetles

Janbechynea is a genus of leaf beetles in the family Orsodacnidae. There are at least 12 described species in Janbechynea, found in North America. The genus is named after the Czech entomologist Jan Bechyně.

== Species ==
These 12 species belong to the genus Janbechynea:

Subgenus Janbechynea

- Janbechynea elongata (Jacoby, 1888)
- Janbechynea inversosimilis Monrós, 1954
- Janbechynea julioi Santiago-Blay, 2004
- Janbechynea maldonadoi Santiago-Blay, 2004
- Janbechynea paradoxa Monrós, 1953
- Janbechynea snyderae Santiago-Blay, 2004
- Janbechynea woodburyi Santiago-Blay, 2004

Subgenus Bothroscelis Monrós, 1954 (type species: Aulacoscelis fulvipes Jacoby, 1888)

- Janbechynea fulvipes (Jacoby, 1888)
- Janbechynea georgepauljohnringo Santiago-Blay, 2004
- Janbechynea melyroides (Crowson, 1946)
- Janbechynea suzanita Santiago-Blay, 2004
- Janbechynea virkkii Santiago-Blay, 2004
