= Mantura floridana =

Scientific classification
- Kingdom: Animalia
- Phylum: Arthropoda
- Class: Insecta
- Order: Coleoptera
- Suborder: Polyphaga
- Infraorder: Cucujiformia
- Family: Chrysomelidae
- Tribe: Alticini
- Genus: Mantura
- Species: M. floridana

Binomial name
- Mantura floridana Crotch, 1873

Species of beetle

Mantura floridana is a species of flea beetle in the family Chrysomelidae. It is found in North America. Larvae feed on Fallopia scandens. They appear yellow through the leaf epidermis, as the larvae are leaf miners.
