= Stenorhopalus rubriceps =

Scientific classification
- Domain: Eukaryota
- Kingdom: Animalia
- Phylum: Arthropoda
- Class: Insecta
- Order: Coleoptera
- Suborder: Polyphaga
- Infraorder: Cucujiformia
- Family: Cerambycidae
- Genus: Stenorhopalus
- Species: S. rubriceps

Binomial name
- Stenorhopalus rubriceps (Blanchard, 1851)

Species of beetle

Stenorhopalus rubriceps is a species of beetle in the family Cerambycidae. It was described by Émile Blanchard in 1851.
