= Mantura rustica =

Scientific classification
- Kingdom: Animalia
- Phylum: Arthropoda
- Clade: Pancrustacea
- Class: Insecta
- Order: Coleoptera
- Suborder: Polyphaga
- Infraorder: Cucujiformia
- Family: Chrysomelidae
- Genus: Mantura
- Species: M. rustica

Binomial name
- Mantura rustica (Linnaeus, 1767)

Species of beetle

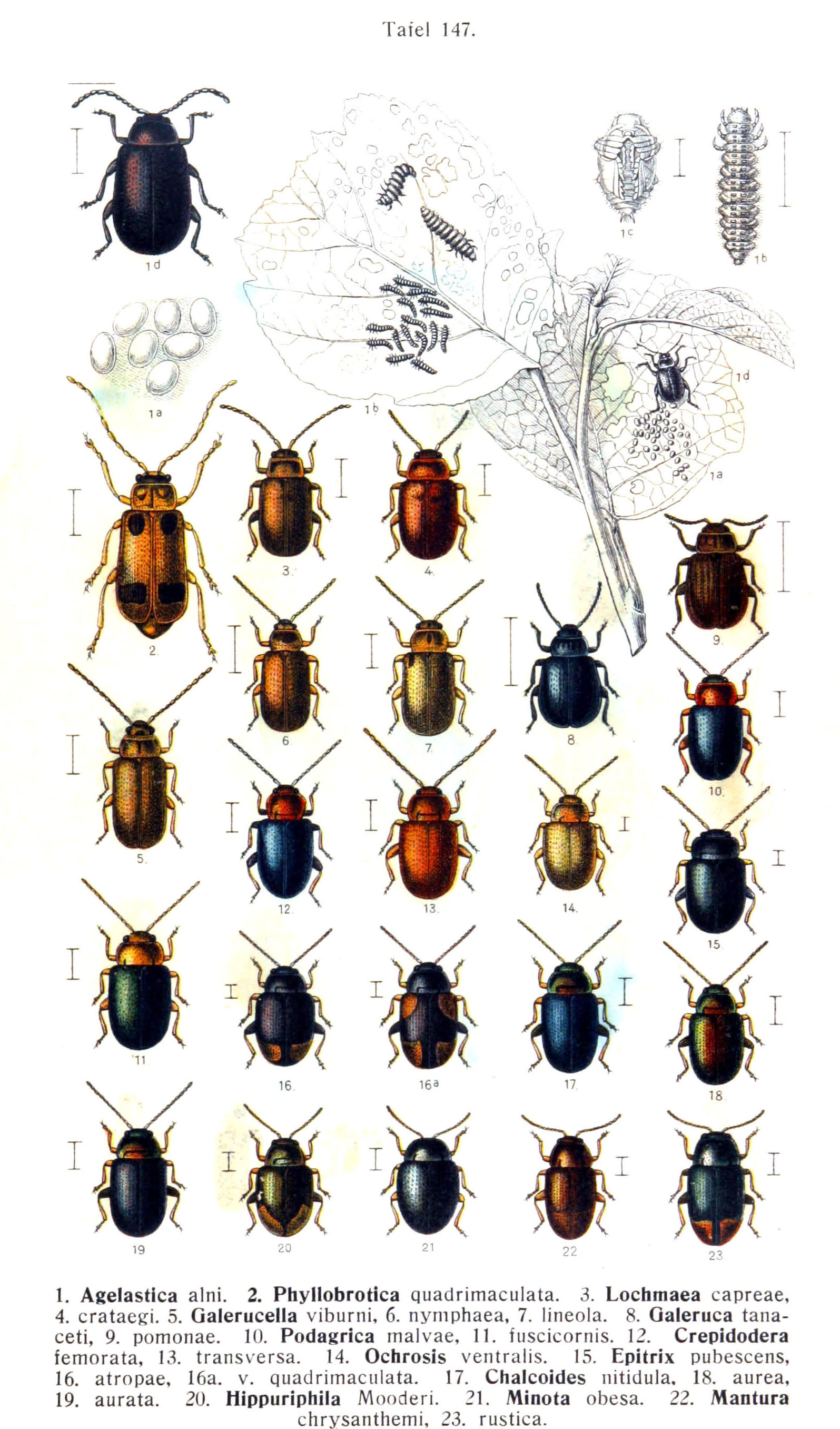
Insect illustration; Mantura rustica is #23

Mantura rustica is a species of Chrysomelidae family.
