= Stenorhopalus rugosus =

Scientific classification
- Kingdom: Animalia
- Phylum: Arthropoda
- Class: Insecta
- Order: Coleoptera
- Suborder: Polyphaga
- Infraorder: Cucujiformia
- Family: Cerambycidae
- Subfamily: Cerambycinae
- Genus: Stenorhopalus
- Species: S. rugosus

Binomial name
- Stenorhopalus rugosus Fairmaire & Germain, 1861

Synonyms
- Platynocera rugosa Aurivillius, 1912; Stenorrhopalus rugosus Gemminger & Harold, 1872

Species of beetle

Stenorhopalus rugosus is a species in the longhorn beetle family Cerambycidae. It is native to Argentina and Chile.
