= Stenorhopalus annulatus =

Scientific classification
- Domain: Eukaryota
- Kingdom: Animalia
- Phylum: Arthropoda
- Class: Insecta
- Order: Coleoptera
- Suborder: Polyphaga
- Infraorder: Cucujiformia
- Family: Cerambycidae
- Subfamily: Cerambycinae
- Genus: Stenorhopalus
- Species: S. annulatus

Binomial name
- Stenorhopalus annulatus (R.Philippi & F.Philippi, 1864)

Synonyms
- Platynocera annulata Aurivillius, 1912; Stenorrhopalus annulatus Gemminger & Harold, 1872

Species of beetle

Stenorhopalus annulatus is a species in the longhorn beetle family Cerambycidae. It is native to Chile.
