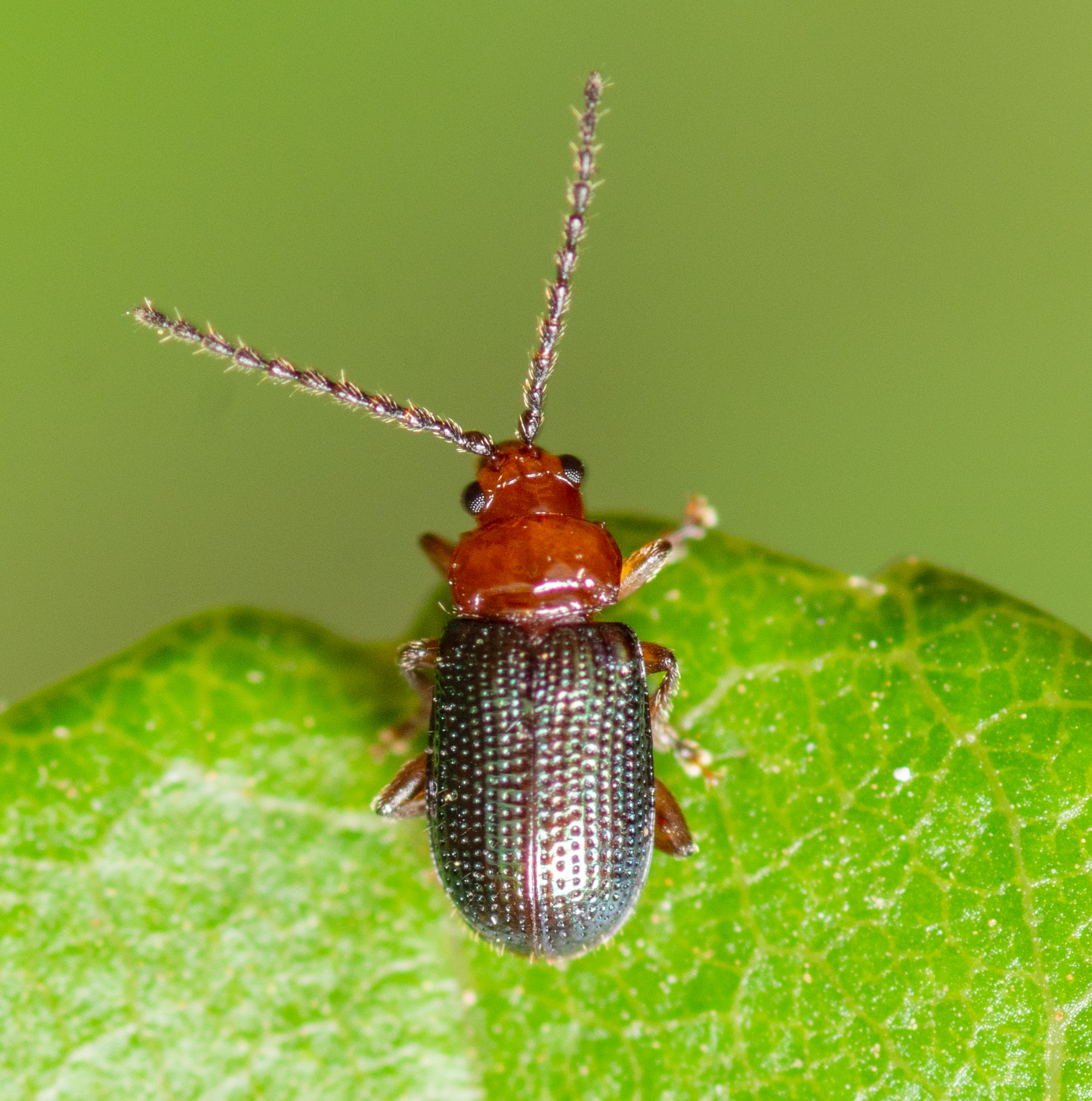
- Trichaltica scabricula

Scientific classification
- Kingdom: Animalia
- Phylum: Arthropoda
- Class: Insecta
- Order: Coleoptera
- Suborder: Polyphaga
- Infraorder: Cucujiformia
- Family: Chrysomelidae
- Tribe: Alticini
- Genus: Trichaltica
- Species: T. scabricula

Binomial name
- Trichaltica scabricula (Crotch, 1873)

= Trichaltica scabricula =

Species of beetle

Trichaltica scabricula is a species of flea beetle in the family Chrysomelidae. It is found in North America. It primarily feeds on various species of ash trees.
