= Monomacra bumeliae =

Scientific classification
- Kingdom: Animalia
- Phylum: Arthropoda
- Class: Insecta
- Order: Coleoptera
- Suborder: Polyphaga
- Infraorder: Cucujiformia
- Family: Chrysomelidae
- Tribe: Alticini
- Genus: Monomacra
- Species: M. bumeliae

Binomial name
- Monomacra bumeliae (Schaeffer, 1905)

Species of beetle

Monomacra bumeliae is a species of flea beetle in the family Chrysomelidae. It is found in Central America and North America.
