= Monomacra opaca =

Scientific classification
- Kingdom: Animalia
- Phylum: Arthropoda
- Class: Insecta
- Order: Coleoptera
- Suborder: Polyphaga
- Infraorder: Cucujiformia
- Family: Chrysomelidae
- Tribe: Alticini
- Genus: Monomacra
- Species: M. opaca

Binomial name
- Monomacra opaca Wilcox, 1953

Species of beetle

Monomacra opaca is a species of flea beetle in the family Chrysomelidae. It is found in North America.
