= Stenorhopalus macer =

Scientific classification
- Domain: Eukaryota
- Kingdom: Animalia
- Phylum: Arthropoda
- Class: Insecta
- Order: Coleoptera
- Suborder: Polyphaga
- Infraorder: Cucujiformia
- Family: Cerambycidae
- Genus: Stenorhopalus
- Species: S. macer

Binomial name
- Stenorhopalus macer (Newman, 1840)

Species of beetle

Stenorhopalus macer is a species of beetle in the family Cerambycidae. It was described by Newman in 1840.
