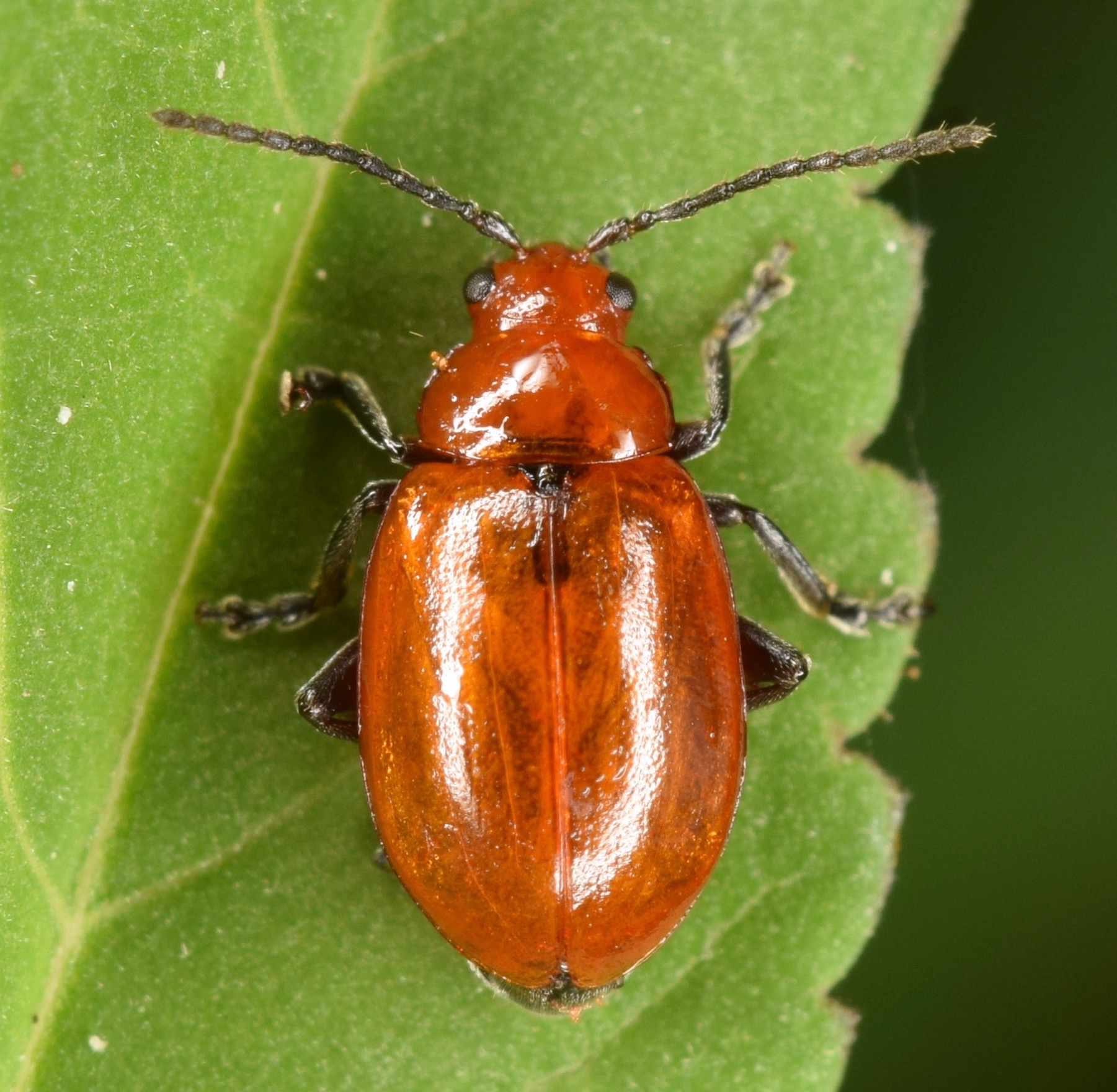

Scientific classification
- Kingdom: Animalia
- Phylum: Arthropoda
- Class: Insecta
- Order: Coleoptera
- Suborder: Polyphaga
- Infraorder: Cucujiformia
- Family: Chrysomelidae
- Genus: Strabala
- Species: S. rufa

Binomial name
- Strabala rufa (Illiger, 1807)

= Strabala rufa =

Species of beetle

Strabala rufa is a species of flea beetle in the family Chrysomelidae. It is found in North America.

== Subspecies ==
These two subspecies belong to the species Strabala rufa:

- Strabala rufa floridana Blake, 1953
- Strabala rufa rufa (Illiger, 1807)
