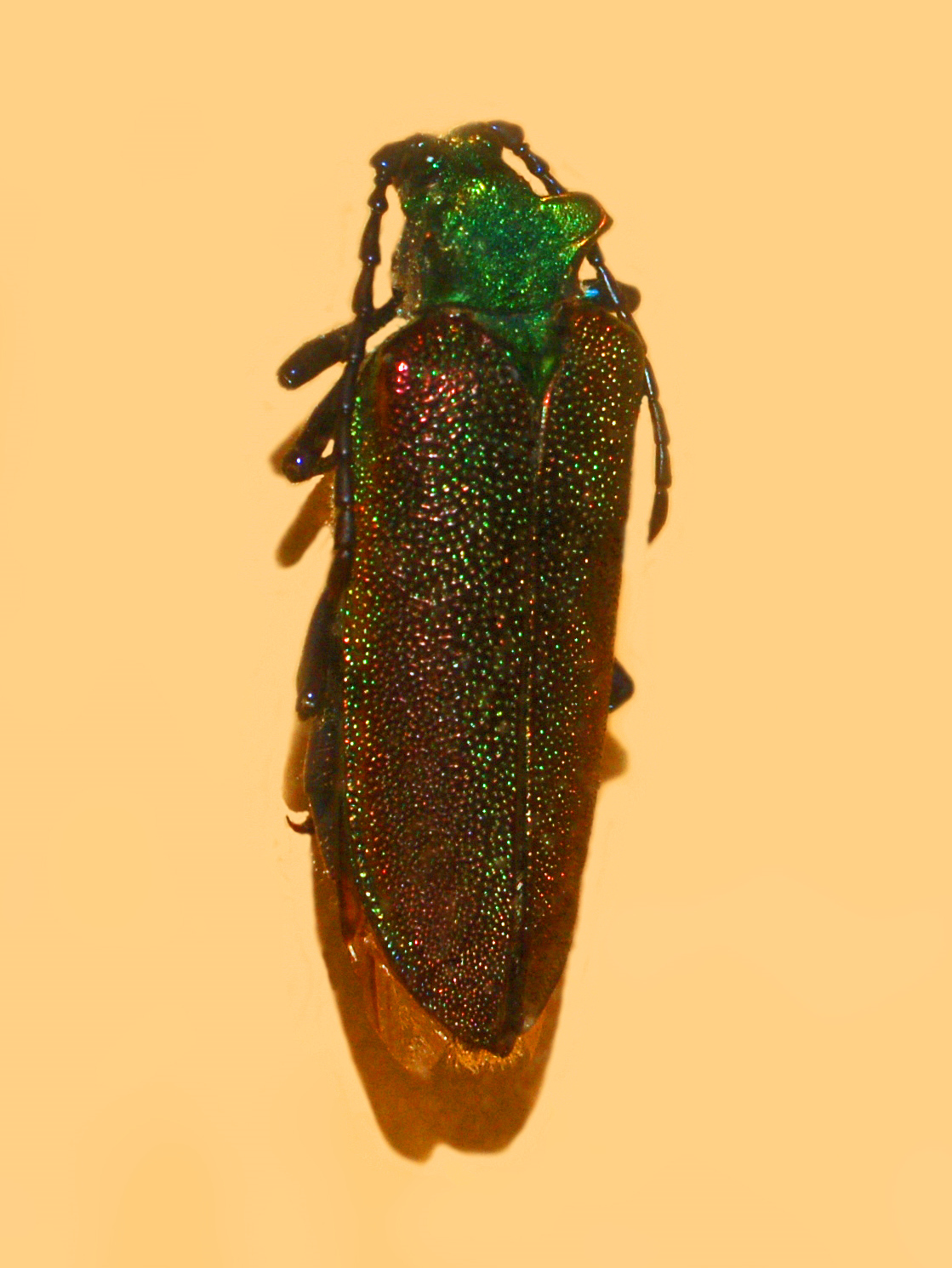
- Female of Cheloderus childreni from Chile

Scientific classification
- Kingdom: Animalia
- Phylum: Arthropoda
- Clade: Pancrustacea
- Class: Insecta
- Order: Coleoptera
- Suborder: Polyphaga
- Infraorder: Cucujiformia
- Family: Oxypeltidae
- Genus: Cheloderus
- Species: C. childreni

Binomial name
- Cheloderus childreni Gray in Griffith, 1832

= Cheloderus childreni =

Species of beetle

Cheloderus childreni is a species of beetle belonging to the family Oxypeltidae.

== Description ==
Cheloderus childreni can reach a length of about 27–45 mm (1.1–1.8 in). This species, traditionally classified within the Cerambycidae and recently included in a new Oxypeltidae family, do not have any morphologic resemblance with the other cerambycids. The body is massive and characterised by a nice metallic colour, green on head and prothorax, and red on elytra. Their antennae and legs have a blue metallic colour. The head, round and small, has two robustly toothed antennae, the pronotum is furnished with two lateral ridges, and the elytra, covered by strong puncture, are bitoothed at the apex. The posterior wings are membranous and unusually pigmented in respect of all other groups of cerambycids. Larvae, typically xylophagous, bore under the bark of coigue (Nothofagus dombeyi, Nothofagaceae), the vicariant of beeches in the Southern Hemisphere.

== Distribution ==
This species is widespread in the Andean region of Chile and Argentina.
