= Stenorhopalus valdiviensis =

Scientific classification
- Domain: Eukaryota
- Kingdom: Animalia
- Phylum: Arthropoda
- Class: Insecta
- Order: Coleoptera
- Suborder: Polyphaga
- Infraorder: Cucujiformia
- Family: Cerambycidae
- Genus: Stenorhopalus
- Species: S. valdiviensis

Binomial name
- Stenorhopalus valdiviensis (Cerda, 1995)

Species of beetle

Stenorhopalus valdiviensis is a species of beetle in the family Cerambycidae. It was described by Cerda in 1995.
