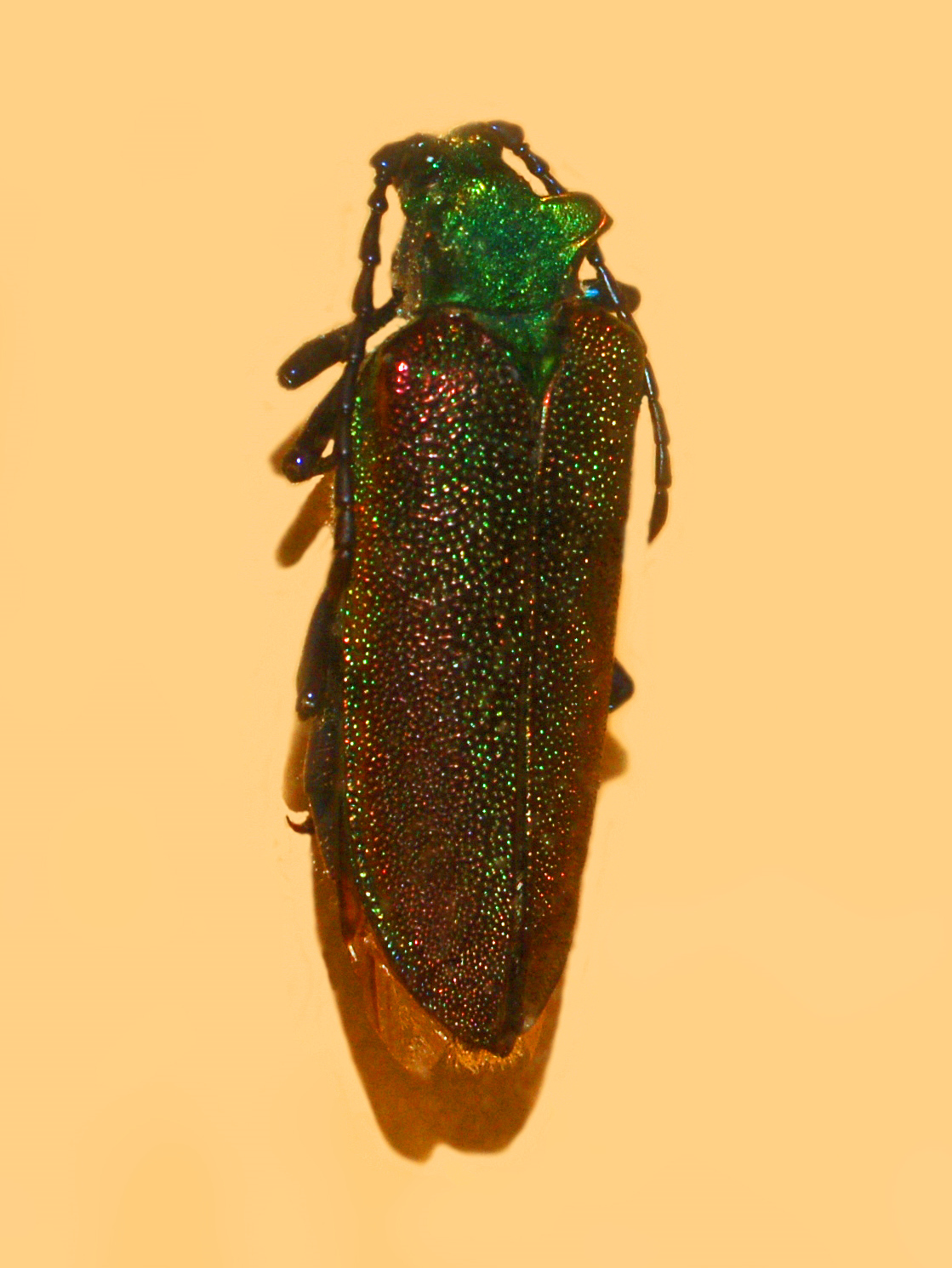
- Female of Cheloderus childreni from Chile

Scientific classification
- Kingdom: Animalia
- Phylum: Arthropoda
- Clade: Pancrustacea
- Class: Insecta
- Order: Coleoptera
- Suborder: Polyphaga
- Infraorder: Cucujiformia
- Clade: Phytophaga
- Superfamily: Chrysomeloidea
- Family: Oxypeltidae; Lacordaire, 1869

= Oxypeltidae =

Family of beetles

The Oxypeltidae are a small family belonging to the superfamily Chrysomeloidea, widespread in the Andean region of Chile and Argentina. They have traditionally been considered a group within the Cerambycidae.

== Description ==
The body is massive and characterised by metallic colour, bluish or green on the head and prothorax, and red on the elytra. Their antennae and legs have a blue metallic colour.

The head, round and small, has two robustly toothed antennae, the pronotum is furnished with longitudinal crests, and the elytra, covered by strong puncture, are bidentate at the apex.

The posterior wings, membranous, have an unusual violet colour, while they are transparent or brownish in cerambycids.

== Biology ==
The larvae, typically xylophagous, attack trees of the genus Nothofagus, the vicariant of beeches in the Southern Hemisphere. The adults are diurnal and can often be found on leaves.

== Systematics ==
They have always been a mystery for specialists since these insects do not show any strong resemblance with other cerambycids. At first placed in the Prioninae due to the lateral ridge of the pronotum, the Oxypeltinae have been separated. Saalas' study on the posterior wings of Cerambycids put into light the fact that the wings of the Oxypeltinae were unusually pigmented. More recently, the research work done on the larvae showed a far (and doubtful) relationship with the Vesperidae. Therefore, the group of Oxypeltinae has been recently considered as a different family.

The Oxypeltidae consist of only two genera and three species:

- Cheloderus Gray, 1832
  - Cheloderus childreni Gray, 1832
  - Cheloderus penai Kuschel, 1955
- Oxypeltus Blanchard, 1851
  - Oxypeltus quadrispinosus Blanchard, 1851

== See also ==
- Cerambycidae
- Disteniidae
- Vesperidae
