= Stenorhopalus bicolor =

Scientific classification
- Domain: Eukaryota
- Kingdom: Animalia
- Phylum: Arthropoda
- Class: Insecta
- Order: Coleoptera
- Suborder: Polyphaga
- Infraorder: Cucujiformia
- Family: Cerambycidae
- Genus: Stenorhopalus
- Species: S. bicolor

Binomial name
- Stenorhopalus bicolor (Philippi, 1865)

Species of beetle

Stenorhopalus bicolor is a species of beetle in the family Cerambycidae. It was described by Rodolfo Amando Philippi in 1865.
