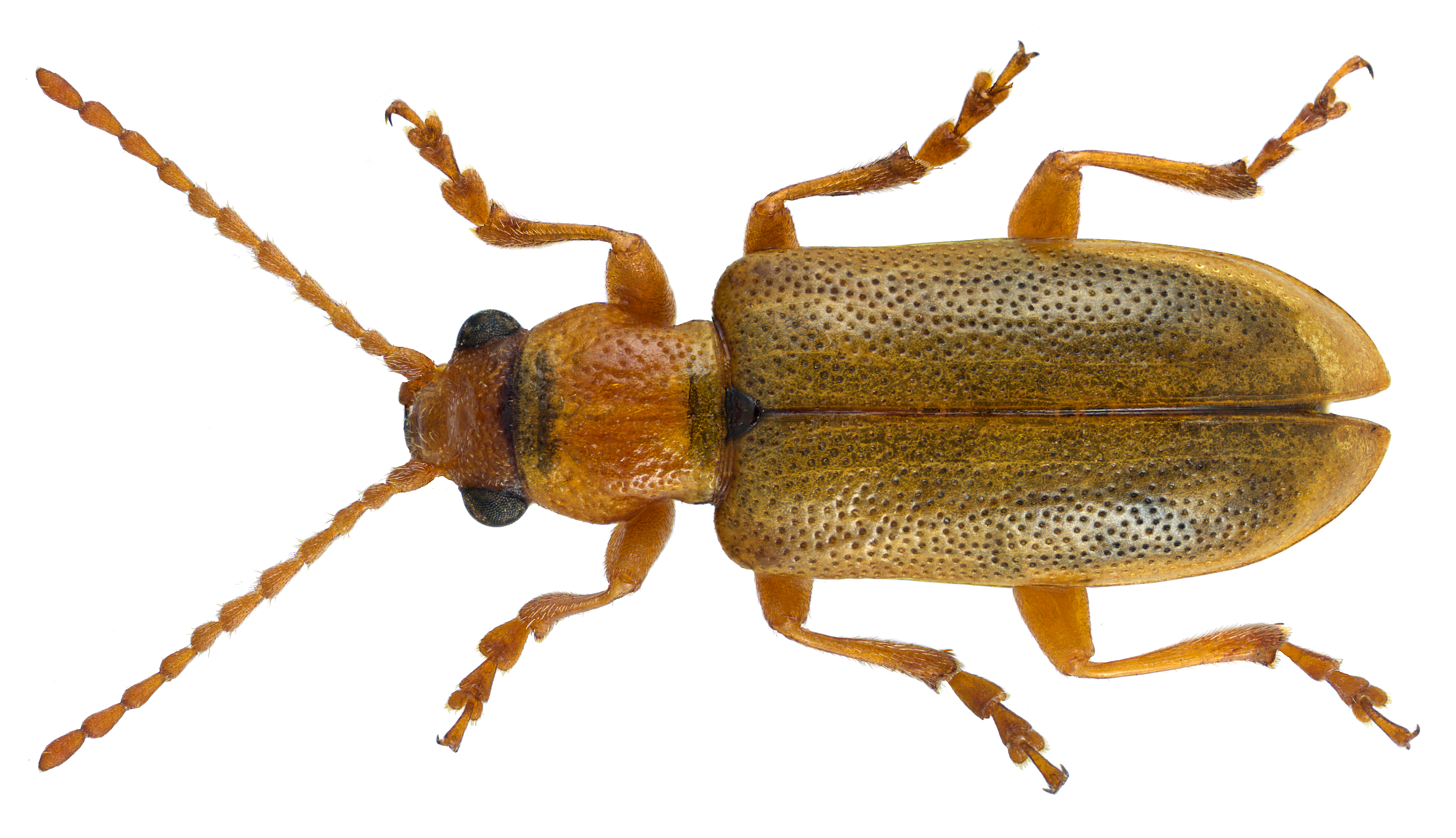
- Orsodacne cerasi

Scientific classification
- Kingdom: Animalia
- Phylum: Arthropoda
- Clade: Pancrustacea
- Class: Insecta
- Order: Coleoptera
- Suborder: Polyphaga
- Infraorder: Cucujiformia
- Family: Orsodacnidae
- Genus: Orsodacne
- Species: O. cerasi

Binomial name
- Orsodacne cerasi (Linnaeus, 1758)

Synonyms
- List: Chrysomela cerasi Linnaeus, 1758; Crioceris cantharoidis Fabricius, 1775; Chrysomela nigroculata Moll, 1784; Crioceris pallida Geoffroy, 1785; Crioceris chlorotica Olivier, 1791; Crioceris fulvicollis Fabricius, 1792; Galleruca melanura Fabricius, 1792; Crioceris glabrata Panzer, 1795; Orsodacna limbata Olivier, 1808; Orsodacna lineola Lacordaire, 1845 (junior homonym); Lema atra Gistel, 1857; Orsodacne cerasi var. duftschmidi Weise, 1891; Orsodacne cerasi ab. horvathi Laczó, 1912; Orsodacne cerasi var. baudii Pic, 1913; Orsodacne cerasi var. lacordairei Pic, 1913; Orsodacne cerasi var. limbatipennis Pic, 1913; Orsodacne cerasi var. theresae Pic, 1913; Orsodacne cerasi ab. bohemica Roubal, 1914; Orsodacna cerasi ab. suturalis Jacobson, 1922; Orsodacne cerasi ab. palaseki Zoufal, 1926; Orsodacne cerasi ab. johannis Csiki, 1941; Orsodacne cerasi ab. apicalis Csiki, 1953; Orsodacne cerasi ab. budensis Csiki, 1953; Orsodacne cerasi ab. humerata Csiki, 1953; Orsodacne cerasi ab. pulchra Csiki, 1953; Orsodacne cerasi ab. simplex Csiki, 1953; Orsodacne cerasi ab. tenuecincta Csiki, 1953

= Orsodacne cerasi =

Species of beetle

Orsodacne cerasi is a species of leaf beetle in the family Orsodacnidae.

== Description ==
Orsodacne cerasi is pale orange in colour and measures 4.5–6.4 mm in length. Within the genus it is identified by having diffusely punctured elytra and being almost hairless.

== Habitat and lifecycle ==
Adult O. cerasi may be found in mixed or deciduous woodland. They are active between the months of April and September and have been recorded feeding on a range of plants, favouring woody and herbaceous plants with white flowers, including: Syringa vulgaris, Heracleum sphondylium, Petroselinum spp., Aruncus dioicus, Crataegus monogyna, Filipendula ulmaria, Prunus avium, Prunus domestica, and Sorbus aucuparia.
