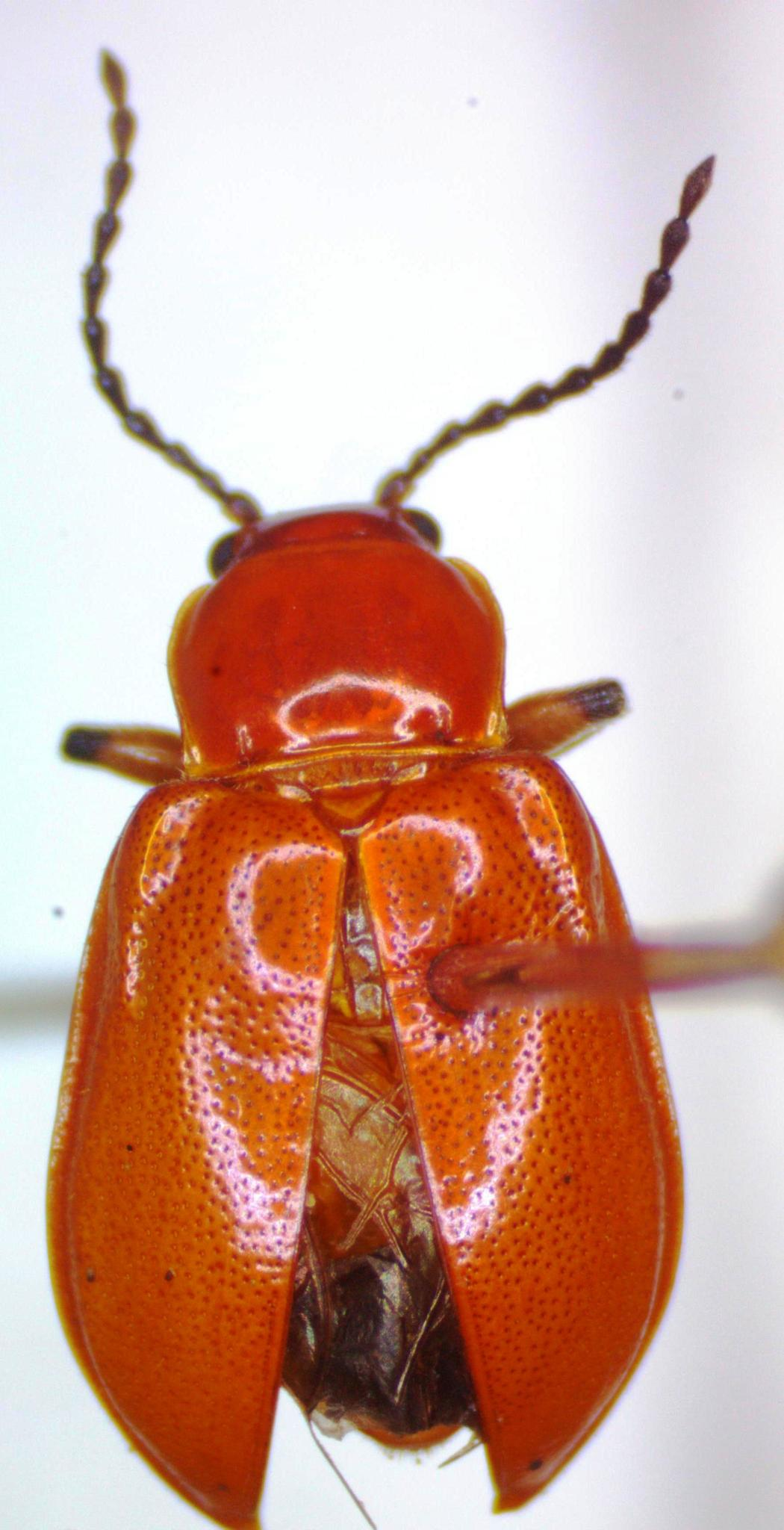
- Aulacoscelis melanocera

Scientific classification
- Domain: Eukaryota
- Kingdom: Animalia
- Phylum: Arthropoda
- Class: Insecta
- Order: Coleoptera
- Suborder: Polyphaga
- Infraorder: Cucujiformia
- Family: Orsodacnidae
- Subfamily: Aulacoscelidinae
- Genus: Aulacoscelis; Duponchel & Chevrolat in d'Orbigny, 1842

= Aulacoscelis =

Genus of beetles

Aulacoscelis is a genus of leaf beetles in the family Orsodacnidae. There are at least two described species in Aulacoscelis.

== Species ==
These two species belong to the genus Aulacoscelis:

- Aulacoscelis candezei Chapuis, 1874^{i c g b}
- Aulacoscelis vogti Monrós, 1959^{i c g}

Data sources: i = ITIS, c = Catalogue of Life, g = GBIF, b = Bugguide.net
