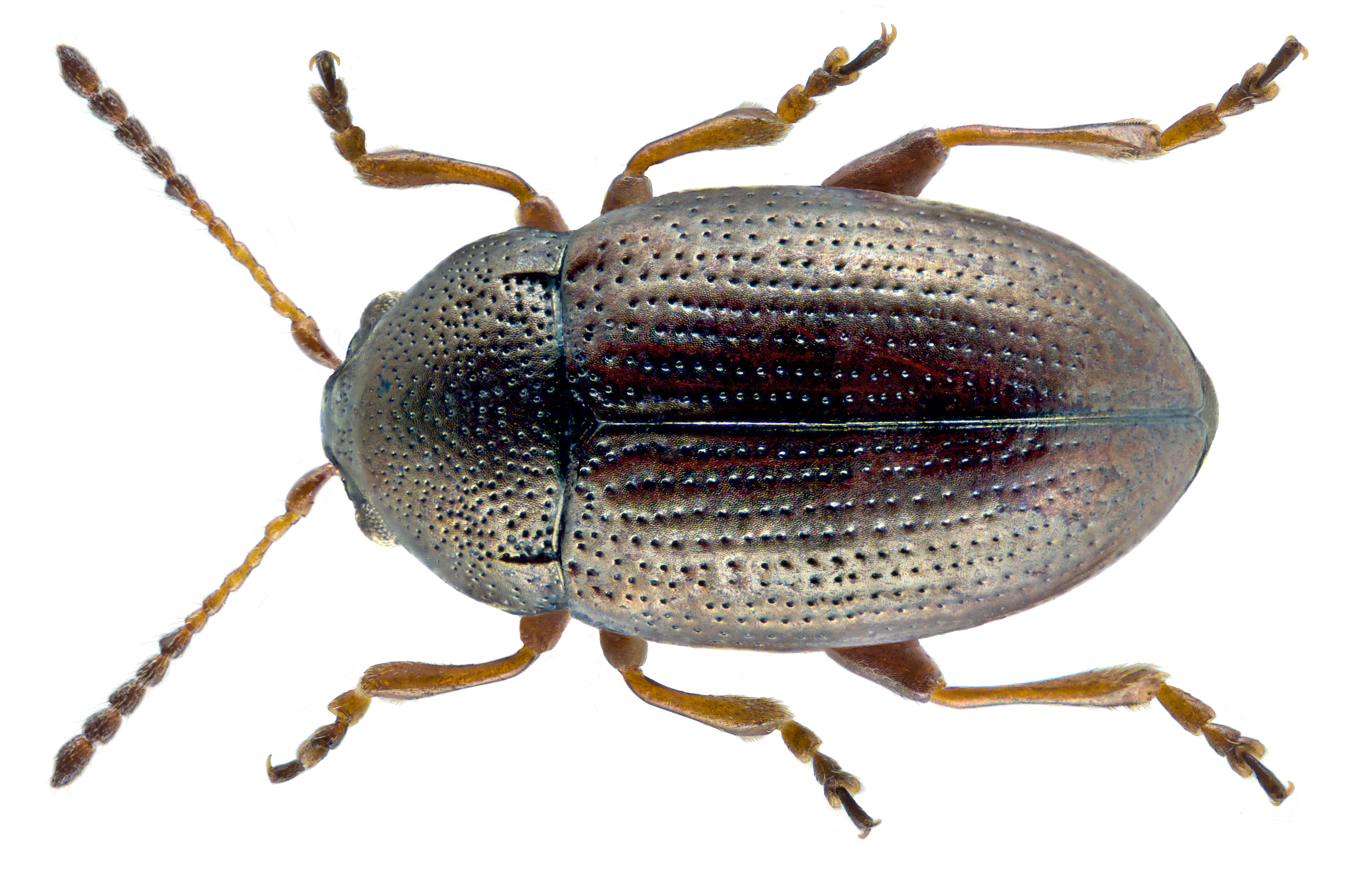
- Mantura chrysanthemi 1,8-2,5 mm

Scientific classification
- Kingdom: Animalia
- Phylum: Arthropoda
- Clade: Pancrustacea
- Class: Insecta
- Order: Coleoptera
- Suborder: Polyphaga
- Infraorder: Cucujiformia
- Family: Chrysomelidae
- Genus: Mantura
- Species: M. chrysanthemi

Binomial name
- Mantura chrysanthemi (Koch, 1803)

= Mantura chrysanthemi =

Species of beetle

Mantura chrysanthemi is a species of Chrysomelidae family, that is common across the Palearctic realm from Ireland, England, Turkey west to the Carpathians, and also in Algeria and Morocco.
