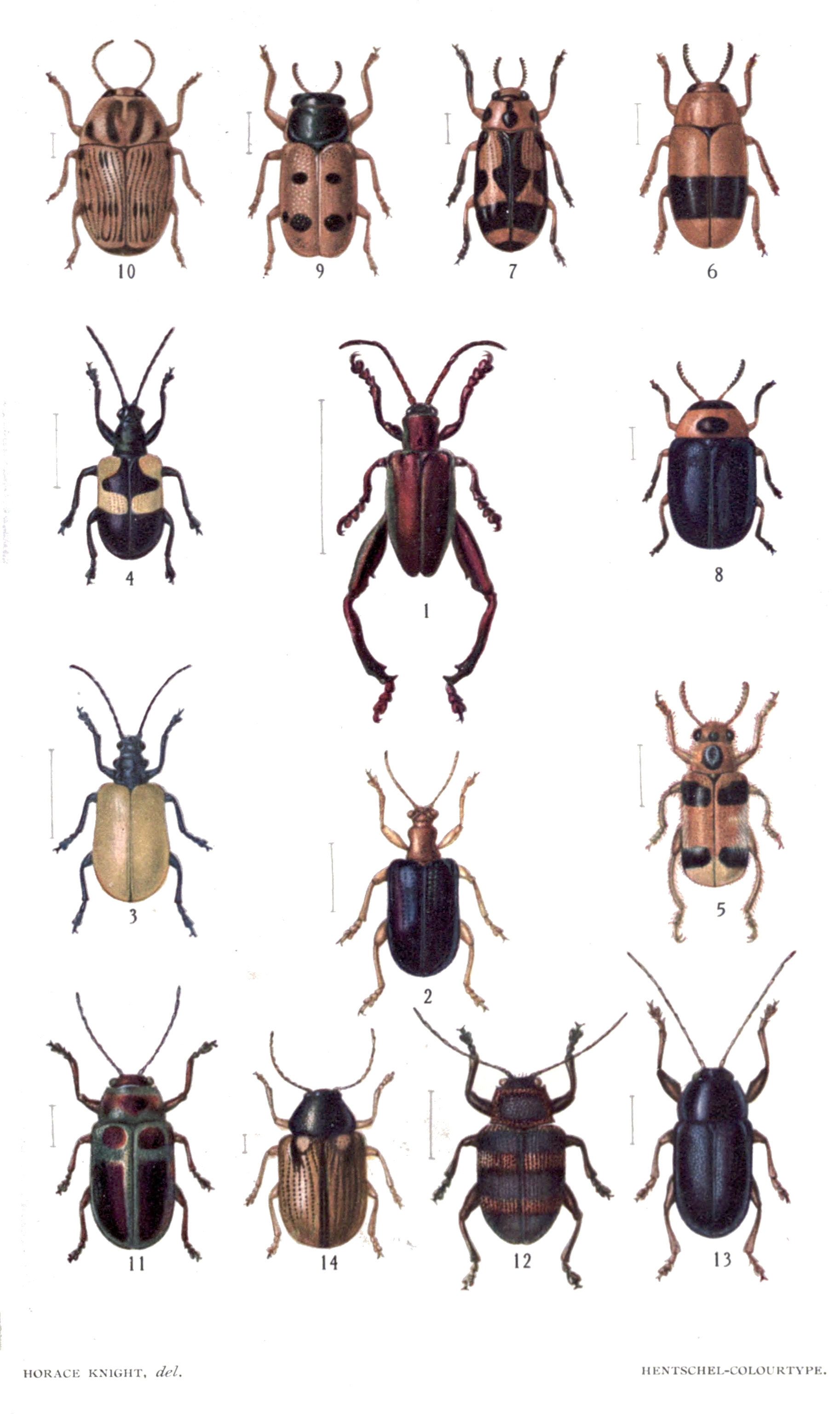
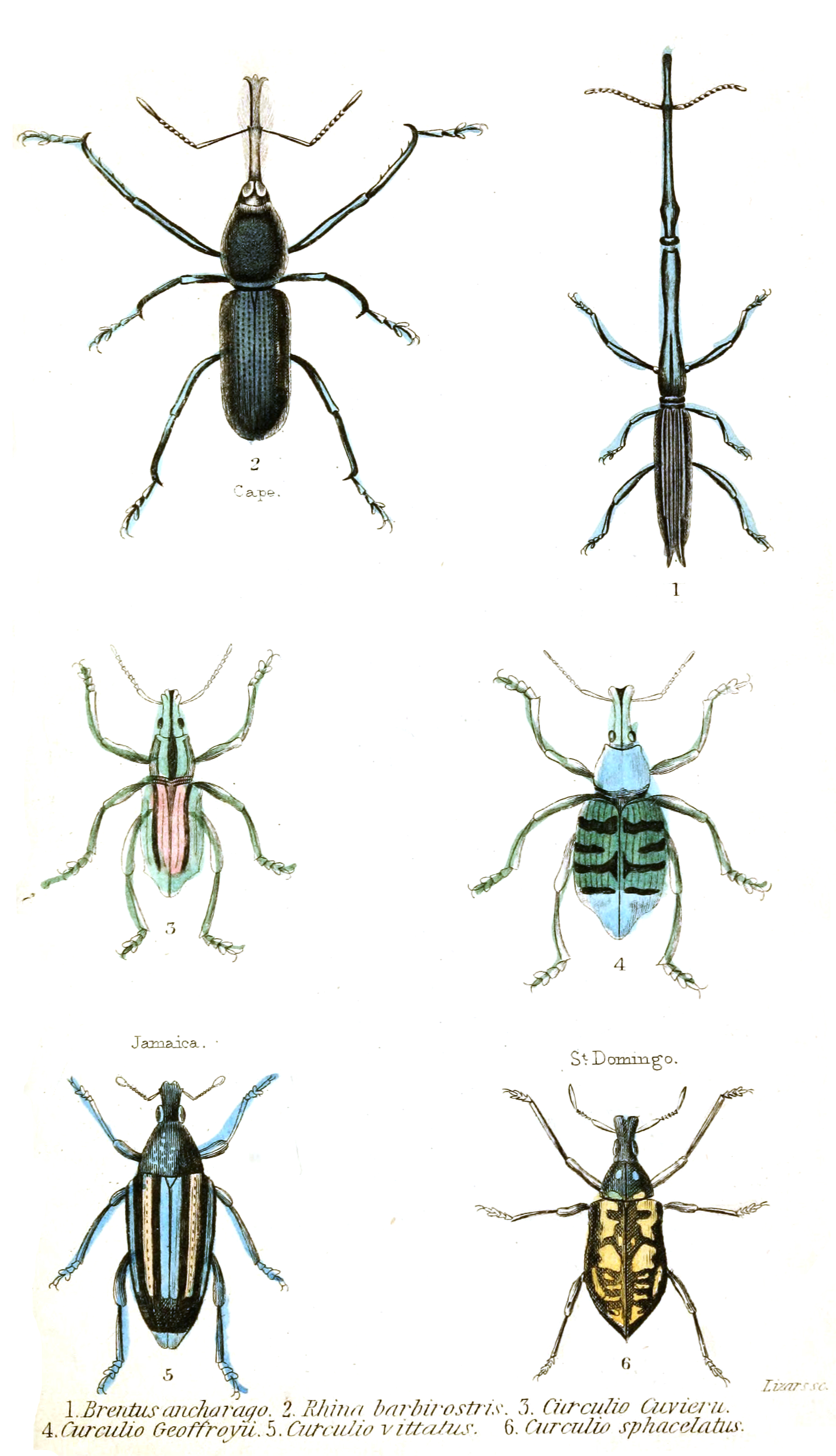
- Typical Chrysomeloidea (left) and Curculionoidea (right)

Scientific classification
- Kingdom: Animalia
- Phylum: Arthropoda
- Clade: Pancrustacea
- Class: Insecta
- Order: Coleoptera
- Suborder: Polyphaga
- Infraorder: Cucujiformia
- Clade: Phytophaga

= Phytophaga =

Clade of beetles

Phytophaga is a clade of beetles within the infraorder Cucujiformia consisting of the superfamilies Chrysomeloidea and Curculionoidea that are distinctive in the plant-feeding habit combined with the tarsi being pseudotetramerous or cryptopentamerous, where the fourth tarsal segment is typically greatly reduced or hidden by the third tarsal segment. The Cucujoidea are a sister to the Phytophaga. In some older literature the term Phytophaga was applied only to the Chrysomeloidea.

Families in the Phytophaga (Note: Note: this simplified cladogram omits 4 additional families in the Chrysomeloidea, and between 2-7 in the Curculionoidea.)

- Phytophaga
  - Chrysomeloidea
    - - Megalopodidae
      - Cerambycidae
    - Chrysomelidae
  - Curculionoidea
    - - Nemonychidae
      - Anthribidae
    - - Belidae
      - - Attelabidae
        - - Brentidae
          - Curculionidae

Simplified Phytophaga phylogeny

The diversification of species within the Phytophaga is thought to be associated with the speciation within the Angiosperms. The plant-feeding habit may have been a shift from microfungal, spore-feeding (on strobili and cycads) and saprotrophic habits. With nearly 125,000 described species they are the second largest phytophagous lineage of insects after the order Lepidoptera. GH45s are only encoded by the genomes possessed by the Phytophaga beetles. The derived G45s from Phytophaga degrade 3 main substances: amorphous cellulose, xyloglucan and glucomannan. It was also composed of fungal sequences, acquired by gene transfer from fungi.
