= Ant-like beetle =

Ant-like beetle may refer to:

- Ant-like flower beetle, a family of beetles known to consume small arthropods, pollen, fungi, and whatever else they can find
- Ant-like leaf beetle, a family of beetles found on the undersides of the leaves of shrubs and trees
- Ant-like stone beetle, a family of beetles known to feed on oribatid mites
