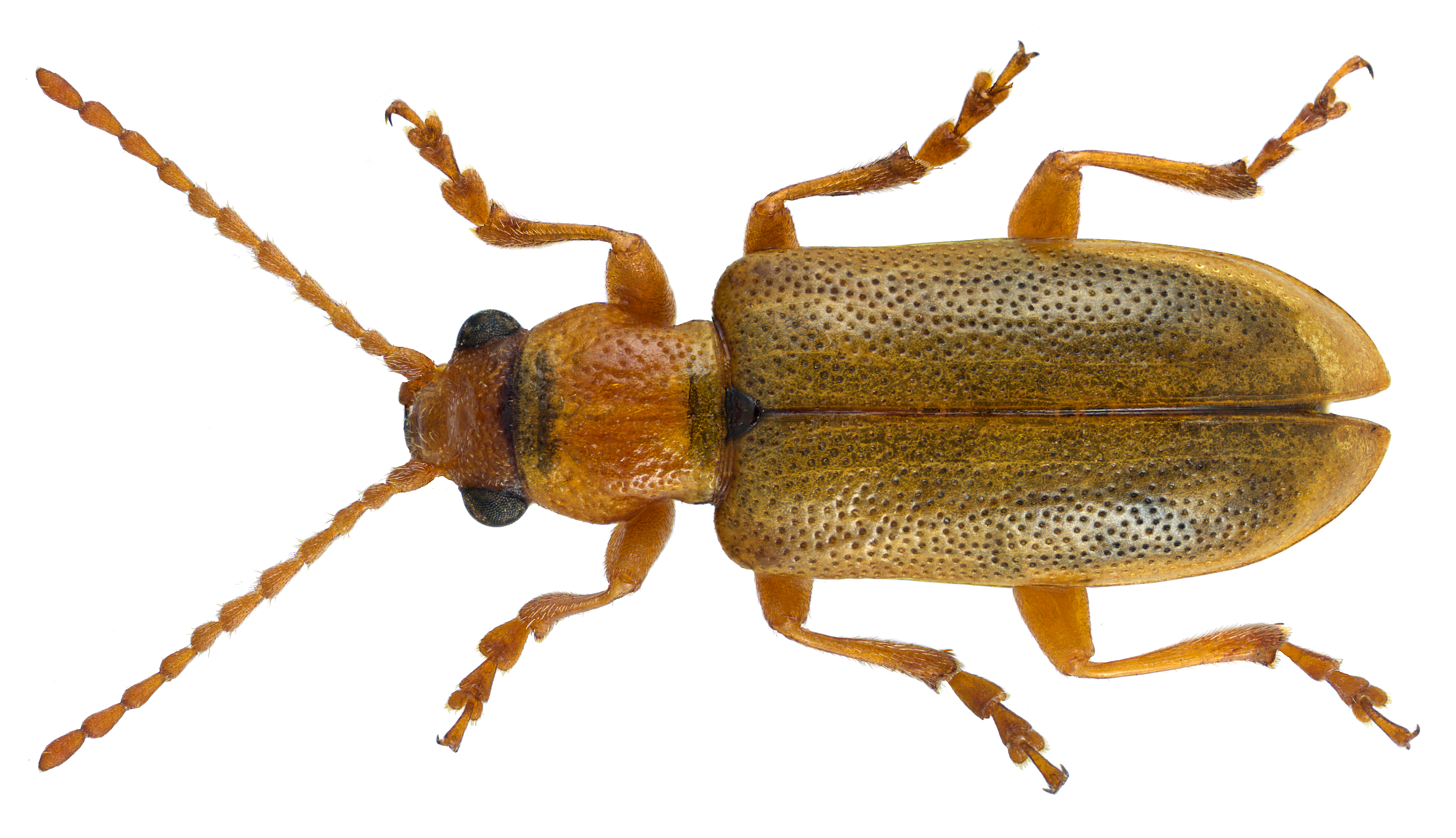
- Orsodacne cerasi

Scientific classification
- Domain: Eukaryota
- Kingdom: Animalia
- Phylum: Arthropoda
- Class: Insecta
- Order: Coleoptera
- Suborder: Polyphaga
- Infraorder: Cucujiformia
- Superfamily: Chrysomeloidea
- Family: Orsodacnidae; Thomson, 1859

Subfamilies
- Aulacoscelidinae; Orsodacninae

= Orsodacnidae =

Orsodacnidae Temporal range: Aptian–Recent

Family of beetles

The Orsodacnidae are a small family of leaf beetles, previously included as a subfamily within the Chrysomelidae. It is the smallest of the chrysomeloid families in North America; Oxypeltidae is smaller, with only three species in South America. A fossil species of Aulacoscelis is known from the Early Cretaceous (Aptian-Albian) Santana Group of Brazil.

== Subfamilies and genera ==
- Subfamily Aulacoscelidinae
  - Aulacoscelis
  - Janbechynea
- Subfamily Orsodacninae
  - Orsodacne
