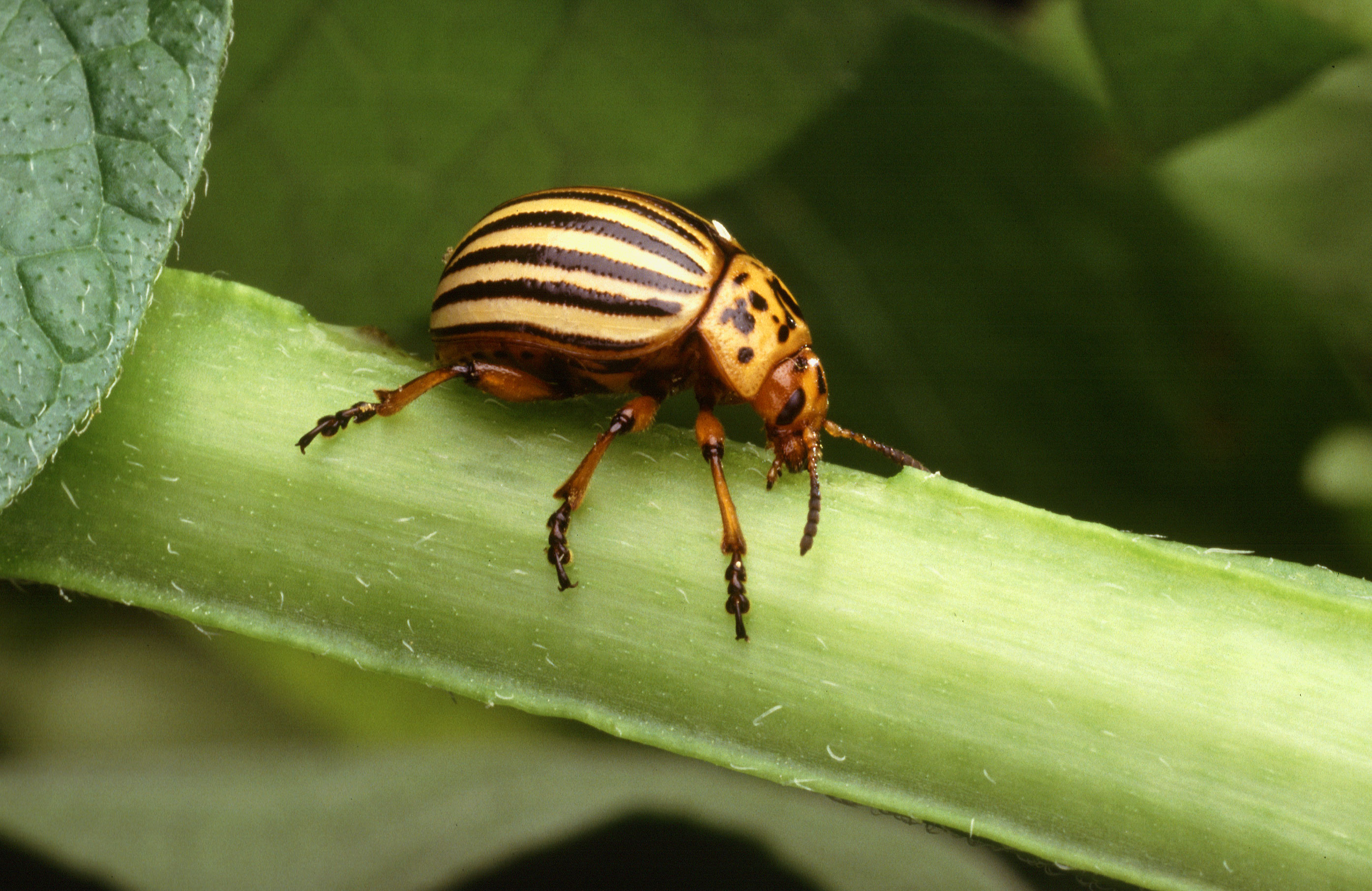
- Colorado potato beetle, Leptinotarsa decemlineata

Scientific classification
- Kingdom: Animalia
- Phylum: Arthropoda
- Clade: Pancrustacea
- Class: Insecta
- Order: Coleoptera
- Suborder: Polyphaga
- Infraorder: Cucujiformia
- Clade: Phytophaga
- Superfamily: Chrysomeloidea; Latreille, 1802

Families
- Cerambycidae - long-horned beetles Chrysomelidae - leaf beetles Disteniidae; Megalopodidae; Orsodacnidae; Oxypeltidae; Vesperidae

= Chrysomeloidea =

Superfamily of beetles

The Chrysomeloidea are an enormous superfamily of beetles, with tens of thousands of species. The largest families are Cerambycidae, long-horned beetles, with more than 35,000 species, and Chrysomelidae, leaf beetles, with more than 13,000 species.

== Overview ==
The Chrysomeloidea, like all other Phytophaga, typically have the fourth tarsal segment reduced and hidden by the third segment. Several species in the families Cerambycidae and Chrysomelidae are important plant pests. The spotted cucumber beetle is a serious pest of vegetables and is a very common insect on all sorts of flowers. The Colorado potato beetle, Leptinotarsa decemlineata, attacks potatoes and other members of the Solanaceae. The Asian long-horned beetle is a serious pest of trees where it has been introduced.. It seems almost evident that during the Jurassic and the Cretaceous the Chrysomelidae were pollen feeders and then they became external and later on internal feeders on or in leaves, buds, twigs and roots.

Some authorities in the past have suggested removing the Cerambycidae and related families (Disteniidae, Oxypeltidae, and Vesperidae) from Chrysomeloidea to create a separate superfamily "Cerambycoidea" (e.g.,), but in the absence of evidence to support the monophyly of the resulting groups, this proposal has not been widely accepted by the scientific community.

In multiple recent molecular phylogenetic studies, the family Chrysomelidae has been recovered as the sister group to the remaining families in Chrysomeloidea, while the families Megalopodidae and Orsodacnidae, traditionally considered closely related to Chrysomelidae or as subfamilies of it, are found to be more closely related to Cerambycidae and its related families Disteniidae, Oxypeltidae, and Vesperidae.

== Bibliography ==
- Löbl, Ivan; Smetana, Ales, eds. (2010). Chrysomeloidea. Brill. ISBN 978-90-04-26091-7.
- Haddad, S.; McKenna, D.D. (2016). "Phylogeny and evolution of the superfamily Chrysomeloidea (Coleoptera: Cucujiformia)". Syst Entomol. 41 (4): 697–716. doi:10.1111/syen.12179. S2CID 87055542.
