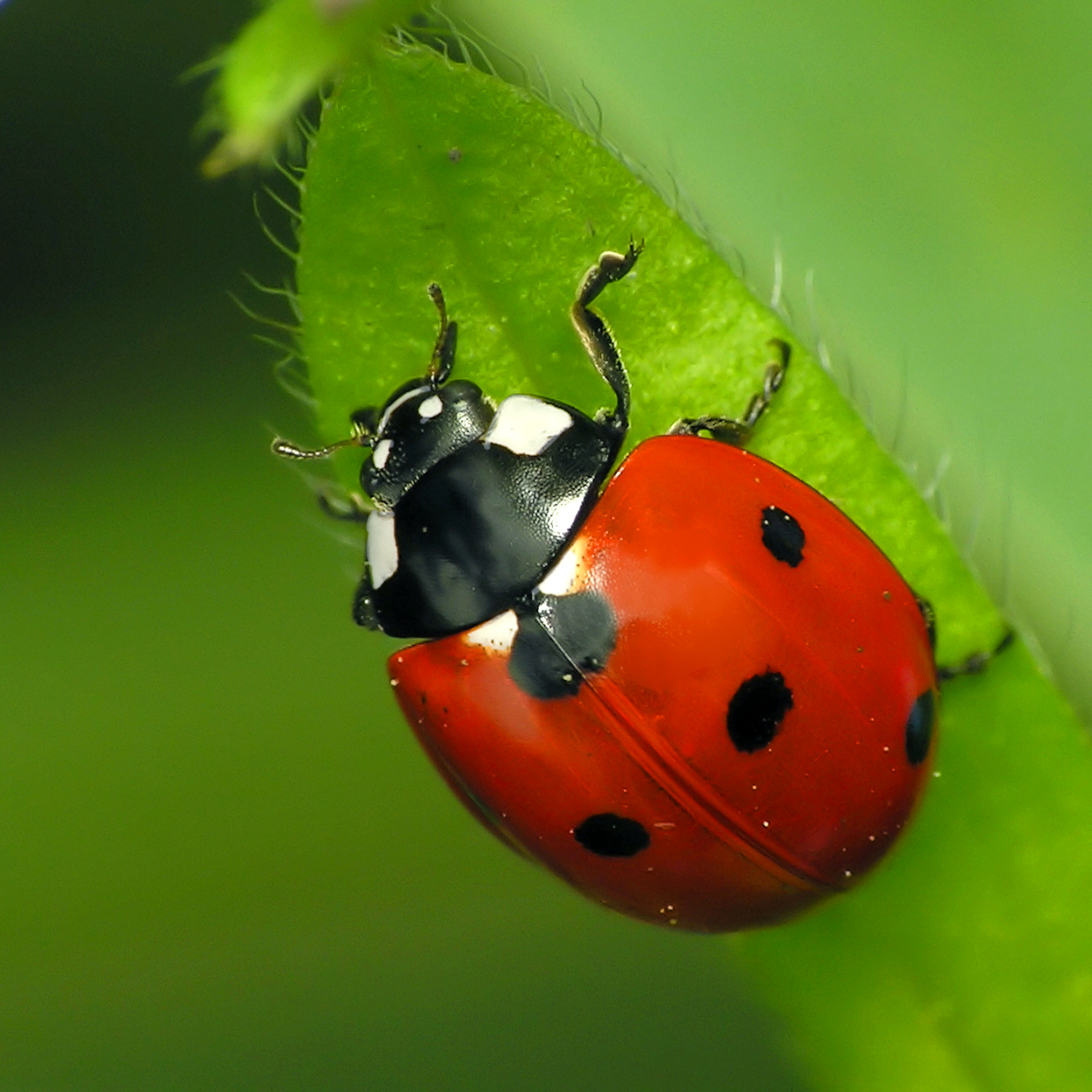
- Coccinella septempunctata

Scientific classification
- Kingdom: Animalia
- Phylum: Arthropoda
- Clade: Pancrustacea
- Class: Insecta
- Order: Coleoptera
- Suborder: Polyphaga
- Infraorder: Cucujiformia; Lameere, 1938

Superfamilies
- Chrysomeloidea; Cleroidea; Coccinelloidea; Cucujoidea; Curculionoidea; Lymexyloidea; Tenebrionoidea

= Cucujiformia =

Infraorder of beetles

Cucujiformia is an infraorder of polyphagan beetles, representing most plant-eating beetles. Genetic studies have shown that the traditional superfamily "Cucujoidea" is not a single natural group, helping scientists better understand how "Cucujiformia" evolved. Rather transcriptomic evidence shows that Cucujiformia likely originated in the Permian, with major superfamily diversification during the Cretaceous time period, in connection with the rise of flowering plants.

- Cucujiformia
  - - - - Lymexyloidea
        - Tenebrionoidea
      - Cleroidea
    - - Cucujoidea
      - Phytophaga
        - Chrysomeloidea
        - Curculionoidea
  - Coccinelloidea

The infraorder contains the seven superfamilies:

- Chrysomeloidea (~7 families including longhorn beetles and leaf beetles)
- Cleroidea (checkered beetles, bark-gnawing beetles and soft-winged flower beetles)
- Coccinelloidea (15 families, includes ladybirds and fungus beetles)
- Cucujoidea (~27 families)
- Curculionoidea (~8 families primarily consisting of weevils and also including snout beetles and bark beetles)
- Lymexyloidea (ship-timber beetles)
- Tenebrionoidea (formerly "Heteromera") (30 families including blister beetles and ant-like beetles)

== Clavicornia ==
Clavicornia were a former order of beetles. The genera in it have been reassigned to the following families:

- Nitidulidae
- Cucujidae
- Cryptophagidae
- Latridiidae
- Coccinellidae

The name comes from the shape of the antennae (Latin cornum or horn) that looks like a club (Latin clava).
