= Okra (disambiguation) =

Okra may refer to:

- Okra (Abelmoschus esculentus), a flowering plant valued for its edible seed pods
  - Okra soup
- Other plants known as "okra"
  - "Bush okra", also known as Mulukhiyah
  - Chinese okra, also known as Luffa
  - West African okra, aka Abelmoschus caillei
- Okra, the name in antiquity of Nanos (plateau) in Slovenia
- "Okra" (song), a single by rapper Tyler, the Creator
- Operation Okra, the Australian contribution to the military intervention against ISIL
- The Okra Project, an American mutual aid collective that provides support to black trans, non-binary, and gender-nonconforming people.

== See also ==
- OCCRA, an annual high school robotics competition
- Okara (disambiguation)
- Okura (disambiguation)
