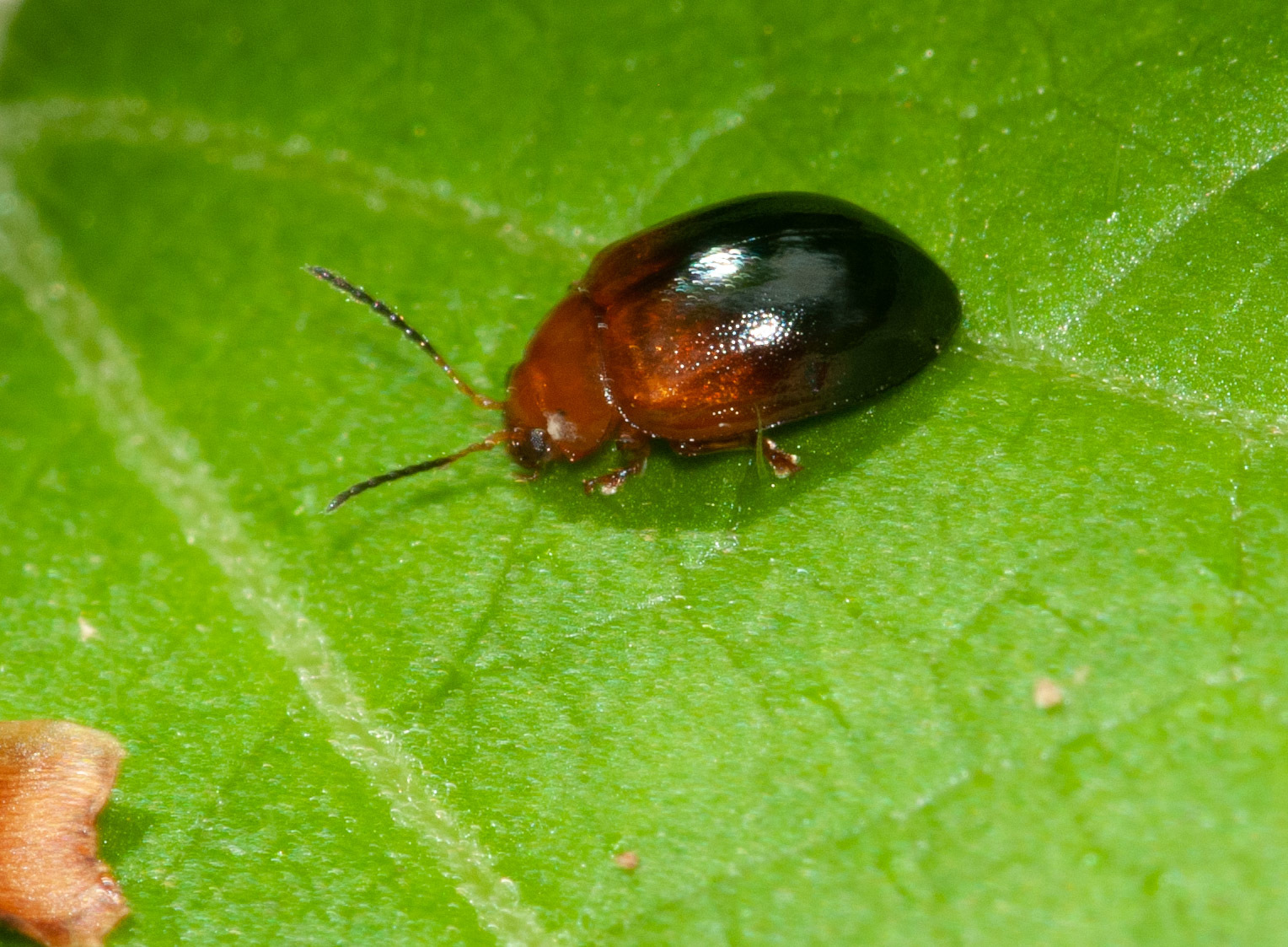
- Nisotra bicolorata, Australia

Scientific classification
- Domain: Eukaryota
- Kingdom: Animalia
- Phylum: Arthropoda
- Class: Insecta
- Order: Coleoptera
- Suborder: Polyphaga
- Infraorder: Cucujiformia
- Family: Chrysomelidae
- Subfamily: Galerucinae
- Tribe: Alticini
- Genus: Nisotra; Baly, 1864

= Nisotra =

Genus of beetles

Nisotra is a genus of flea beetles in the family Chrysomelidae. They are found in Africa, Asia, and Australia. There are around 90 described species in Nisotra, including about 70 in Sub-Saharan Africa and Madagascar. Many of these species are agricultural pests.

== Description ==
Nisotra can be recognised by: a thickset and distinctly convex body; the pronotum as wide of the elytra basally; the pronotum anterior margin with two longitudinal groove-like impressions, often deeply impressed and sometimes reaching middle of pronotum.

== Diet ==
Nisotra feed on plants in the families Malvaceae, Bombacaceae, Tiliaceae, Fabaceae, Rosaceae, Asteraceae, Lamiaceae, Rubiaceae, Poaceae and Orchidaceae.

Larvae feed on roots (boring in stems has also been reported), while adults feed on leaves.

== Pests ==
In the Solomon Islands, N. basselae is a pest on bele (Abelmoschus manihot). Its impact is so severe that bele is no longer grown in many places on the islands.

Nisotra chrysomeloides is a pest on okra (Abelmoschus esculentus). Its abundance varies depending on temperature, relative humidity and rainfall. Another okra pest is Nisotra sjostedti.

== Species ==
These species, among others, belong to the genus Nisotra:

- Nisotra apicalis Jacoby 1899
- Nisotra aruwimiana Weise
- Nisotra basselae (Bryant)
- Nisotra bicolorata Csiki, 1940
- Nisotra breweri Baly, 1877
- Nisotra brunnea Jacoby 1894
- Nisotra ceylonensis Jacoby 1899
- Nisotra chapuisi Jacoby 1876
- Nisotra chrysomeloides Jacoby 1885
- Nisotra dilecta (Dalman, 1823)
- Nisotra dohertyi Maulik, 1926
- Nisotra fulva (Medvedev, 2018)
- Nisotra gemella (Erichson, 1834)
- Nisotra goudoti Harold, 1875
- Nisotra insulana Medvedev, 2008
- Nisotra javana Motschulsky, 1866
- Nisotra javanica
- Nisotra klugii Jacoby 1892
- Nisotra lineella Weise, 1916
- Nisotra madagascariensis Jacoby 1901
- Nisotra madurensis Jacoby, 1896
- Nisotra malayana Medvedev, 2016
- Nisotra mera Weise, 1916
- Nisotra nigripennis Jacoby 1903
- Nisotra nigripes Jacoby 1894
- Nisotra obliterata Jacoby
- Nisotra oneili Jacoby 1906
- Nisotra orbiculata Motschulsky, 1866
- Nisotra pallida Jacoby, 1898
- Nisotra semicoerulea Jacoby 1903
- Nisotra sjostedti Jacoby 1903
- Nisotra sordida Weise, 1916
- Nisotra spadicea (Dalman, 1823)
- Nisotra striatipennis Jacoby
- Nisotra submetallica Blackburn, 1894
- Nisotra terminata Jacoby 1894
- Nisotra theobromae Laboissiere, 1920
- Nisotra uniformis Jacoby 1906
- Nisotra xinjiangana Zhang & Yang, 2007
