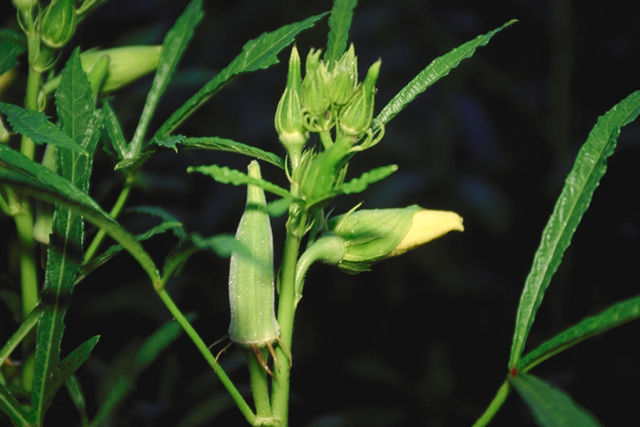
- Abelmoschus esculentus leaves, flower buds and young fruit

Scientific classification
- Kingdom: Plantae
- Clade: Tracheophytes
- Clade: Angiosperms
- Clade: Eudicots
- Clade: Rosids
- Order: Malvales
- Family: Malvaceae
- Subfamily: Malvoideae
- Tribe: Hibisceae
- Genus: Abelmoschus; Medik.

Species
- See text

Synonyms
- Heterotypic synonyms: Bamia R.Br. ex Wall.; Hymenocalyx Zenker

= Abelmoschus =

Genus of flowering plants

Abelmoschus is a genus of about fifteen species of flowering plants in the family Malvaceae, native to tropical Africa, Asia and northern Australia. It was formerly included within Hibiscus, but is now classified as a distinct genus. The genus name derives from Arabic meaning 'father of musk' or 'source of musk' referring to the scented seeds.

Abelmoschus species are used as food plants by the larvae of some Lepidoptera species including Chionodes hibiscella which has been recorded on A. moschatus.

== Description ==
The genus comprises annual and perennial herbaceous plants, growing to 2 m (6 ft 7 in) tall. The leaves are 10–40 cm (3.9–15.7 in) long and broad, palmately lobed with 3–7 lobes, the lobes are very variable in depth, from barely lobed, to cut almost to the base of the leaf. The flowers are 4–8 cm (1.6–3.1 in) diameter, with five white to yellow petals, often with a red or purple spot at the base of each petal. The fruit is a capsule, 5–20 cm (2.0–7.9 in) long, containing numerous seeds.

== Species ==
As of September 2026, Plants of the World Online accepts the following species:

| Name/Author | Year described | Year published | Common name |
|---|---|---|---|
| Abelmoschus angulosus Wall. ex Wight & Arn. | 1834 | | |
| Abelmoschus caillei (A.Chev.) Stevels | 1940 | 1988 | West African okra |
| Abelmoschus crinitus Wall. | 1830 | | |
| Abelmoschus enbeepeegearensis K.J.John, Scariah, Nissar, K.V.Bhat & S.R.Yadav | 2013 | | |
| Abelmoschus esculentus (L.) Moench | 1753 | 1794 | okra |
| Abelmoschus ficulneus (L.) Wight & Arn. | 1753 | 1833 | white wild musk mallow |
| Abelmoschus hostilis (Wall. ex Mast.) M.S.Khan & M.S.Hussain | 1874 | 2001 | |
| Abelmoschus manihot (L.) Medik. | 1753 | 1787 | aibika |
| Abelmoschus moschatus Medik. | 1787 | | abelmosk |
| Abelmoschus muliensis K.M.Feng | 1982 | | |
| Abelmoschus odishae Ramesh Misra | 2023 | | |
| Abelmoschus palianus Sutar, K.V.Bhat & S.R.Yadav | 2013 | | |
| Abelmoschus rhodopetalus F.Muell. | 1861 | | |
| Abelmoschus tuberculatus Pal & Har B.Singh | 1952 | | |

== Uses ==
Several species are edible, with both the young seed pods and the young leaves being eaten as a vegetable. The most important commercially-grown species is okra (Abelmoschus esculentus).

Abelmoschus manihot (aibika) furnishes cordage like jute, and Abelmoschus moschatus (abelmosk) is grown for musk seeds (musk ambrette, a musk substitute, which can cause phytophotodermatitis).

== Gallery of different species ==
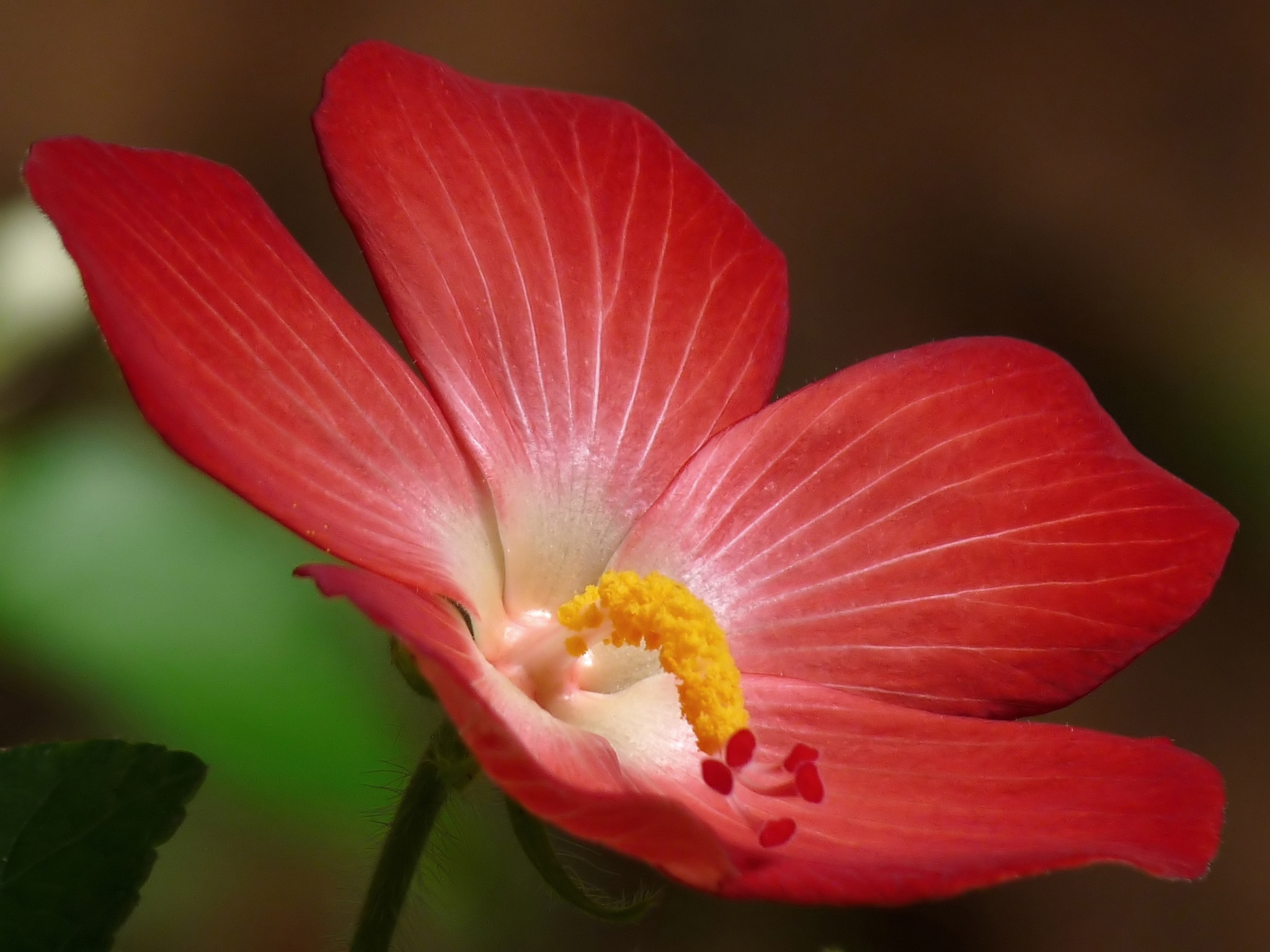
Abelmoschus rhodopetalus (syn. A. sagittifolius) in Kerala, India

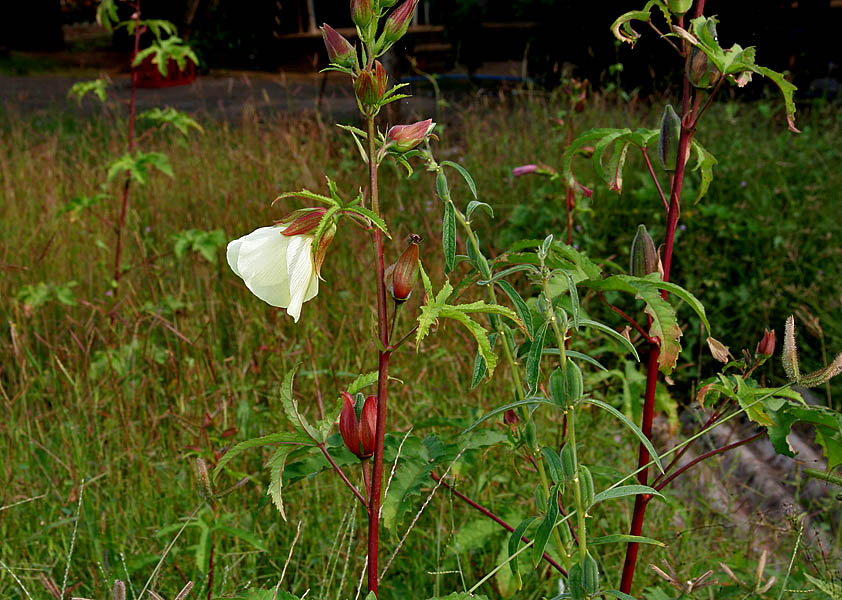
Abelmoschus manihot ssp. tetraphyllus in Goa, India

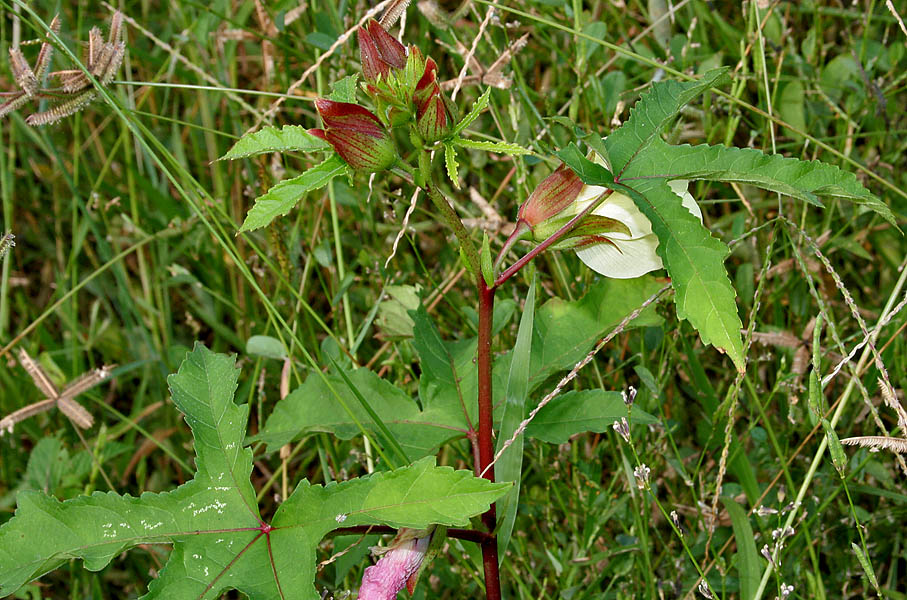
Abelmoschus manihot ssp. tetraphyllus in Goa, India

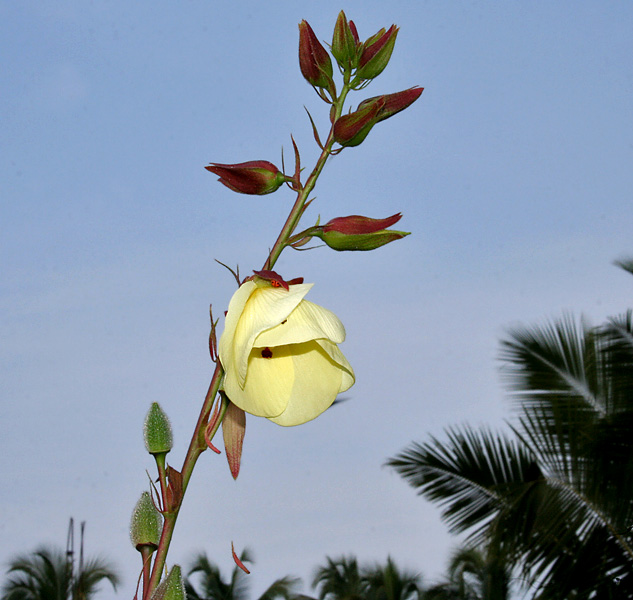
Abelmoschus manihot ssp. tetraphyllus in Goa, India

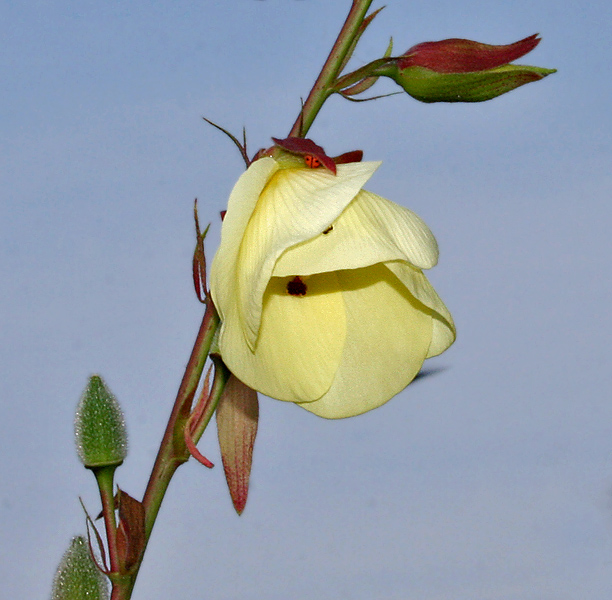
Abelmoschus manihot ssp. tetraphyllus in Goa, India

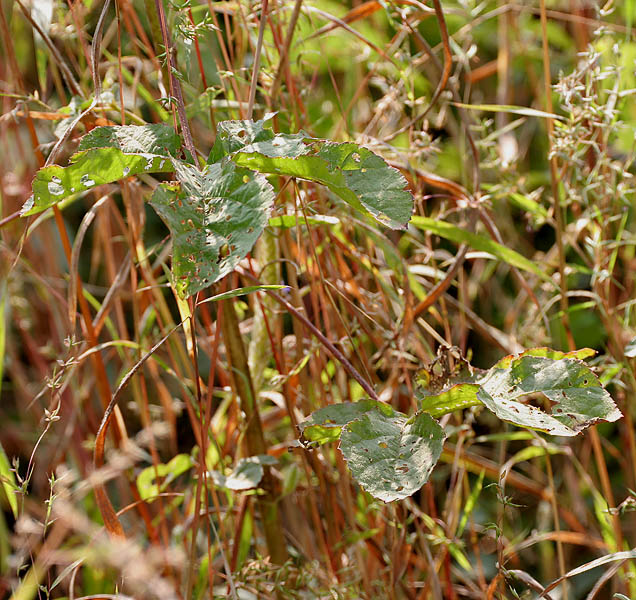
Abelmoschus ficulneus leaves in Kawal Wildlife Sanctuary, India

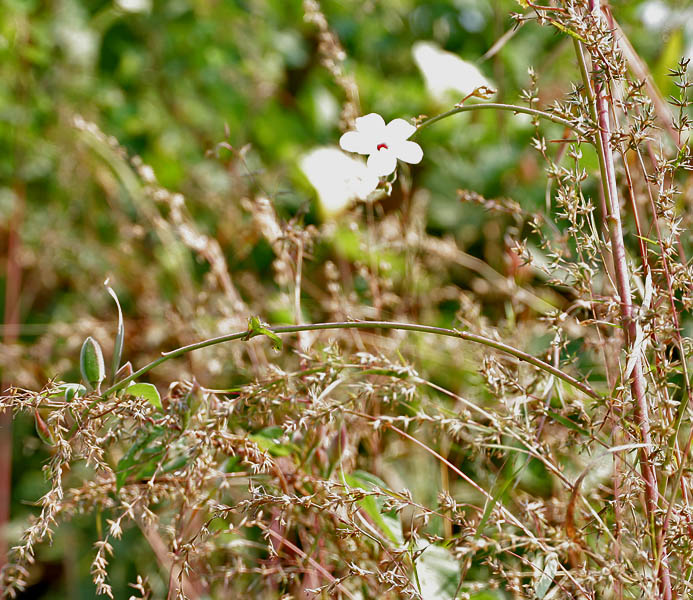
Abelmoschus ficulneus leaves in Kawal Wildlife Sanctuary, India

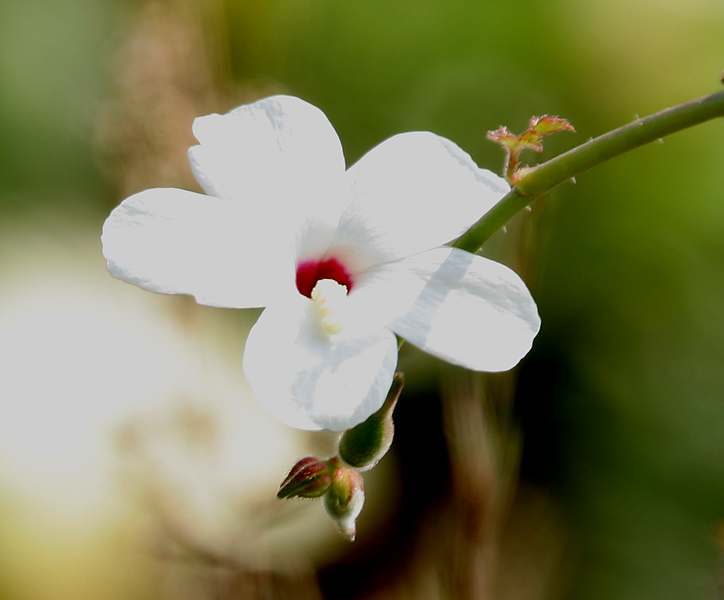
Abelmoschus ficulneus flower in Kawal Wildlife Sanctuary, India

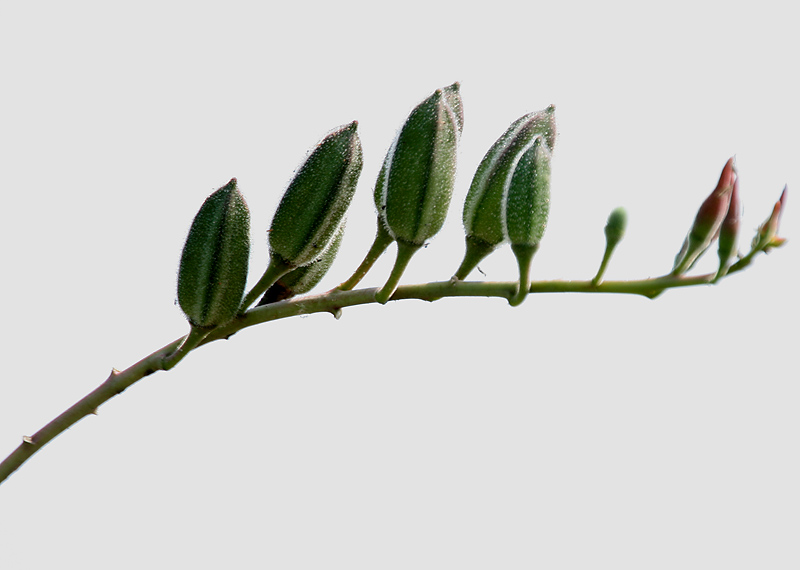
Abelmoschus ficulneus fruit in Kawal Wildlife Sanctuary, India
