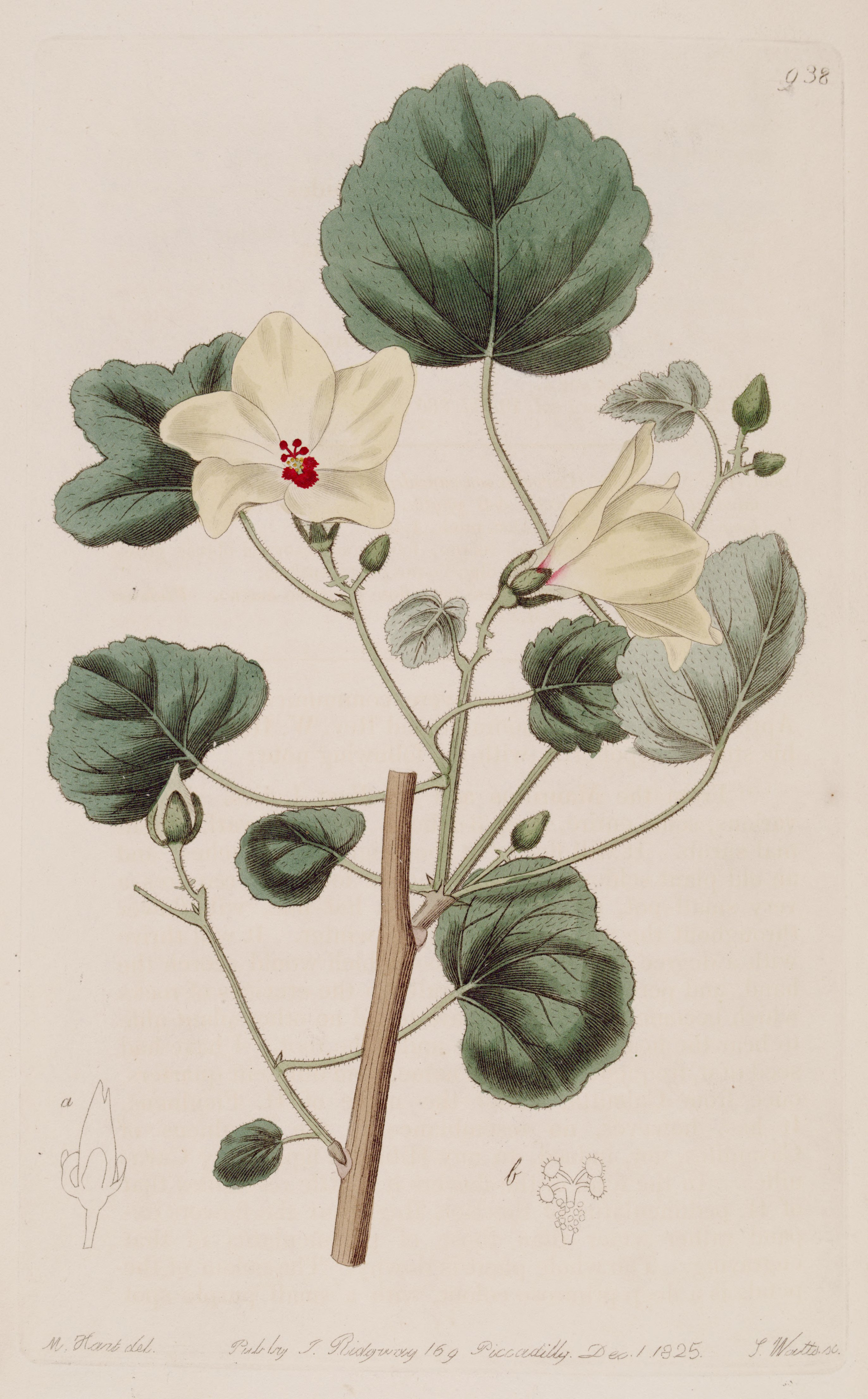
- Illustration (1825)

Scientific classification
- Kingdom: Plantae
- Clade: Tracheophytes
- Clade: Angiosperms
- Clade: Eudicots
- Clade: Rosids
- Order: Malvales
- Family: Malvaceae
- Genus: Abelmoschus
- Species: A. hostilis

Binomial name
- Abelmoschus hostilis (Wall. ex Mast.) M.S.Khan & M.S.Hussain

Synonyms
- Hibiscus hostilis Wall. ex Mast.

= Abelmoschus hostilis =

Species of flowering plant

Abelmoschus hostilis is a rare species of flowering plant in the Malvaceae family. It is native to Bangladesh and Myanmar and is known as "Kantabhendi" in Bengali.

== Taxonomy ==
The species is sometimes treated as a synonym of A. tetraphyllus which itself is generally treated as a subspecies of A. manihot. In 1874, Abelmoschus hostilis was first described as Hibiscus hostilis in Flora of British India by Nathaniel Wallich and Maxwell T. Masters. In 2001, it was described as A. hostilis by Mohammad Mohan Salar Khan and Md.Sakhawat Hussain in Bangladesh Journal of Plant Taxonomy.

== Description ==
Abelmoschus hostilis is a flowering annual herb or undershrub. Its stem is bristly hairy and glabrescent. Its leaves are large, angular, petiolate, and 10 by 8 inches (25 cm × 20 cm) in size. Petiols elongates as much as leaf-blades. Each lamina has 3–5 lobes. They are cordate, crenate to dentate. The lobes are acute. In lower leaves, the petioles are 10 inches (25 cm) in length. Leaf surface has bristles. Stipules are ovate to lanceolate. Bracteoles are also ovate to dentate and are 5–6 in number. One of them is persistent and others are caducous. Bracteoles are shorter than the calyx and are one-fourth as long as the capsule. They are linear and more than five in number. Peduncle is 2 inches (5.1 cm) and dilated at apex.

Its large, bell-shaped, pale yellowish-white flowers start to occur from September. They are 5–6 inches (13–15 cm) in diameter. Five-fold segmented epicalyx are ovate to lanceolate. Calyx are fusiform during bud and later split on one side.

Fruits occur September to November. Capsule-type fruits are oblong to lanceolate. Capsules are 2 inches (5.1 cm) in length and cuspidate. They have five ridges and are setose. In fruits, pedicels accrescent. Seeds are reniform, black and glabrous.

== Distribution and habitat ==
Abelmoschus hostilis is very rare. It can be found in Bangladesh and Myanmar, growing on the loose and moist soil on the hill slopes. In Bangladesh, it is found in Rangamati district.
