= Abelmoschus tuberculatus =

Scientific classification
- Kingdom: Plantae
- Clade: Tracheophytes
- Clade: Angiosperms
- Clade: Eudicots
- Clade: Rosids
- Order: Malvales
- Family: Malvaceae
- Genus: Abelmoschus
- Species: A. tuberculatus

Binomial name
- Abelmoschus tuberculatus Pal & Har B.Singh

Varieties
- Abelmoschus tuberculatus var. deltoidefolius T.K.Paul & M.P.Nayar; Abelmoschus tuberculatus var. tuberculatus

Species of flowering plant

Abelmoschus tuberculatus is a species of flowering plant in the family Malvaceae. It is an annual or subshrub native to northwestern and northern India. It is probably an ancestor to Abelmoschus esculentus, a cultigen of uncertain origin.
