= Abelmoschus caillei =

Scientific classification
- Kingdom: Plantae
- Clade: Tracheophytes
- Clade: Angiosperms
- Clade: Eudicots
- Clade: Rosids
- Order: Malvales
- Family: Malvaceae
- Genus: Abelmoschus
- Species: A. caillei

Binomial name
- Abelmoschus caillei (A.Chev.) Stevels

Synonyms
- Homotypic synonyms: Hibiscus manihot var. caillei A.Chev.; Heterotypic synonyms: Abelmoschus × glutinotextile Kagawa

Species of flowering plant

Abelmoschus caillei, the West African okra, is a plant species in the family Malvaceae. It occurs in humid areas of West and Central Africa where it is used as a vegetable. It originated as an allopolyploid hybrid of Abelmoschus esculentus and A. manihot, and is often mistaken for either of those two plants. The same hybrid was produced experimentally in Japan where it is known as Abelmoschus glutino-textile.

== Description ==
Abelmoschus caillei occurs as an erect and stout herb that is often woody at the base. Its flowers are axillary, with their petals yellow to pink. The plant is typically 60-65 inches tall (though it may reach 85 inches). The stems may be green, red, or green with some red pigmentation. The seeds are typically ovoid to oblong in shape, about 3-5 inches long, and may have a rough surface. The leaves are green and lobed, while petioles are typically purple.

== Taxonomy ==
Abelmoschus caillei was first described as Hibiscus manihot var. caillei by the French botanist Auguste Jean Baptiste Chevalier in 1940. The botanist J.M.C. Stevels raised the variety to species rank and placed it in genus Abelmoschus in 1988. As of September 2026, Plants of the World Online accepts the hybrid name Abelmoschus × caillei (A.Chev.) Stevels with parents Abelmoschus esculentus and Abelmoschus manihot.

== Uses ==
Abelmoschus caillei is consumed as a vegetable in a variety of ways, with young leaves being consumed as leaf vegetable and young fruits being consumed after being cooked or fried. Its edibility combined with its resistance to Bhendi yellow vein mosaic virus allows the plant to be commonly cultivated in subsistence farming in high rainfall areas of West Africa.

Its leaves can also be used as cattle feed.

Intensive contact with the fruit and plant may cause skin irritation.

In Nigeria, the plant is used medicinally for sore throats and child bearing, as well as to make certain household items like rope and sponges.
