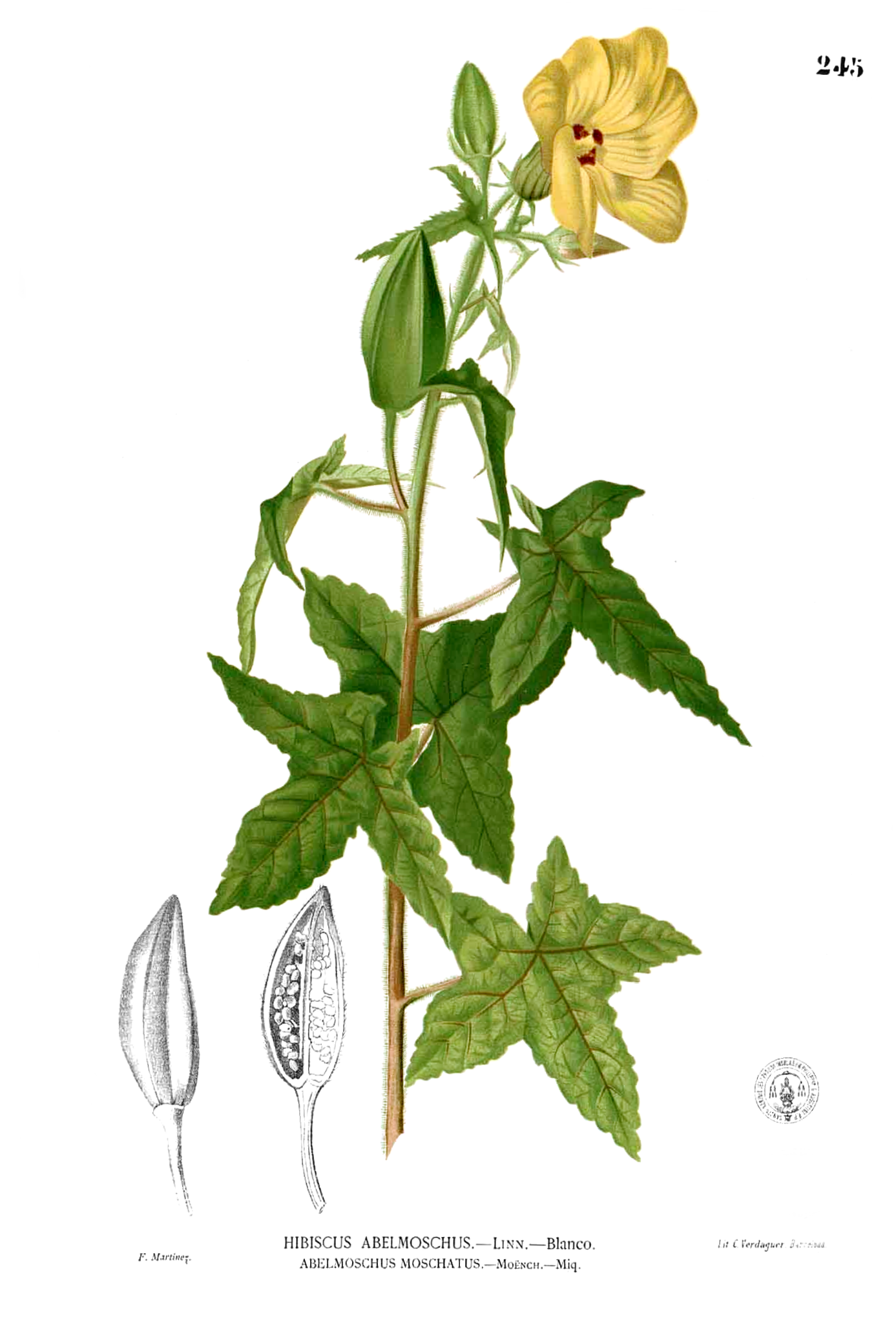

Conservation status
- Least Concern (IUCN 3.1)

Scientific classification
- Kingdom: Plantae
- Clade: Tracheophytes
- Clade: Angiosperms
- Clade: Eudicots
- Clade: Rosids
- Order: Malvales
- Family: Malvaceae
- Genus: Abelmoschus
- Species: A. moschatus

Binomial name
- Abelmoschus moschatus Medik.

Synonyms
- List: Abelmoschus abelmoschus (L.) H.Karst. nom. inval.; Abelmoschus betulifolia Wall.; Abelmoschus chinensis Wall.; Abelmoschus ciliaris Walp.; Abelmoschus cryptocarpus Walp.; Abelmoschus cubensis Walp.; Abelmoschus cucurbitaceus Walp.; Abelmoschus haenkeanus C.Presl; Abelmoschus marianus C.Presl; Abelmoschus palustris Walp.; Abelmoschus pseudoabelmoschus (Blume) Walp.; Abelmoschus roseus Walp.; Abelmoschus sublobatus C.Presl; Hibiscus abelmoschus L.; Hibiscus collinsianus Nutt. ex Torr. & A. Gray; Hibiscus moschatus (Medik.) Salisb.

= Abelmoschus moschatus =

Species of flowering plant

Abelmoschus moschatus is an aromatic and species of medicinal plant in the family Malvaceae native to Asia and Australia. It has many common names, including Abelmosk, ambrette, annual hibiscus, Bamia Moschata, Galu Gasturi, muskdana, musk mallow, musk okra, ornamental okra, rose mallow, tropical jewel hibiscus, and Yorka okra.

== Characteristics ==
The seeds have a sweet, flowery, heavy fragrance similar to that of musk (hence its specific epithet moschātus, scientific Latin for ‘musk’).

Despite its tropical origin, the plant is frost-hardy.

== Uses of the plant ==
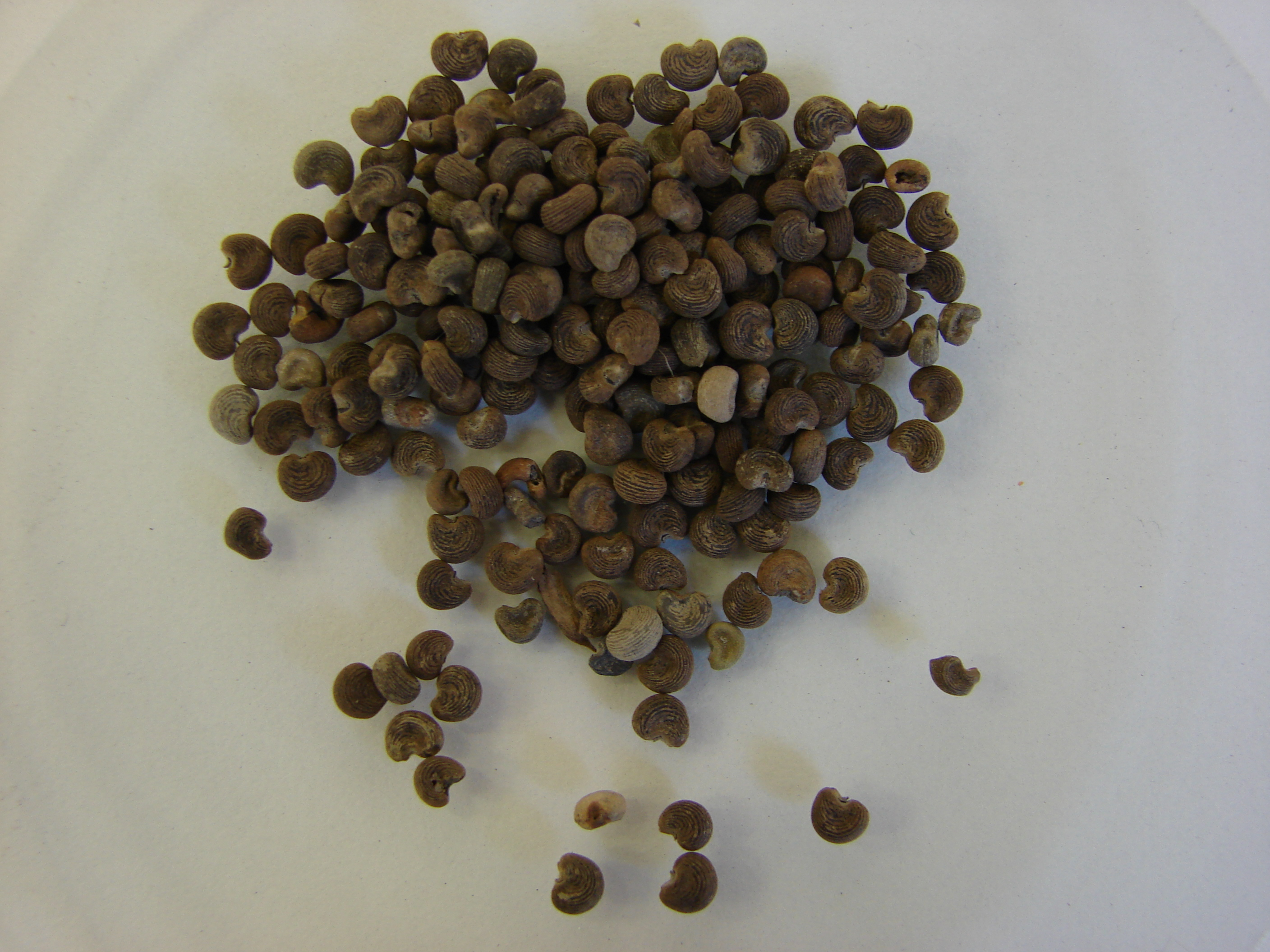

Musk mallow seed oil was once frequently used as a substitute in perfumes for animal musk; however, this use is now mostly replaced by various synthetic musks due to its high cost.

In her 1705 book the Metamorphosis Insectorum Surinamensium, Maria Sibylla Merian described how the young indigenous women would string the seeds on threads and wear the seeds as decoration on their arms. She also indicated that the Indigenous people used the seeds to fatten up their chickens.

=== Culinary uses ===
It has many culinary uses. The seeds are added to coffee; unripe pods ("musk okra"), leaves and new shoots are eaten as vegetables.

=== Medicinal uses ===
Different parts of the plant (latākastūrikā, लताकस्तूरिका, in Sanskrit) have uses in Ayurveda herbal medicine, including as an antispasmodic and to treat gonorrhea. However, use may result in phytophotodermatitis and it has not been proven safe for use during pregnancy and lactation.

=== Other uses ===
In industry the root mucilage provides sizing for paper; tobacco is sometimes flavoured with the flowers.
