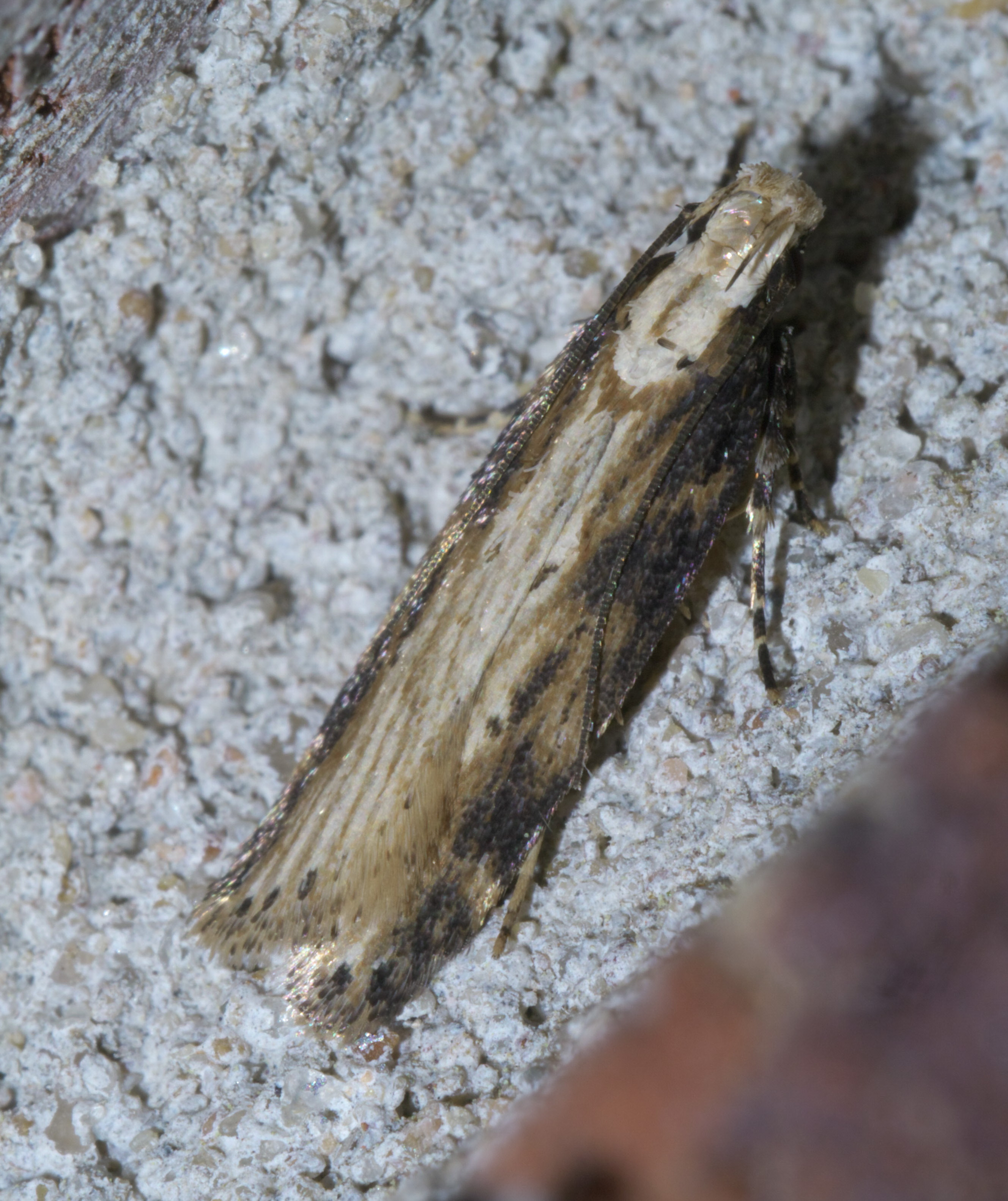

Scientific classification
- Kingdom: Animalia
- Phylum: Arthropoda
- Clade: Pancrustacea
- Class: Insecta
- Order: Lepidoptera
- Family: Gelechiidae
- Genus: Chionodes
- Species: C. hibiscella

Binomial name
- Chionodes hibiscella (Busck, 1903)

Synonyms
- Gelechia hibiscella Busck, 1903

= Chionodes hibiscella =

Species of moth

Chionodes hibiscella is a moth in the family Gelechiidae. It is found in North America, where it has been recorded from Connecticut and Illinois to South Carolina, Louisiana, Mississippi and Texas.

The wingspan is 16–17 mm. The costal half of the forewings is dark brown, and the dorsal half including the apex light ochreous brown. The limit between these two parts of the wing is not very definite and somewhat variable. In the dark costal part lighter, yellowish brown, irregular patches are found, one large indistinct at the middle of the costa and one small rather more distinct costal spot at the beginning of the cilia. In the dorsal light part of the wing are ill-defined darker shadings and the veins are indicated darker so as to produce a striate effect. On the fold at the basal one-third is a small nearly black spot which seems to be constant. There is also a row of black dots around the apical edge. The hindwings are light bluish fuscous.

The larvae feed on Hibiscus, Abelmoschus and Kosteletzkya species.
