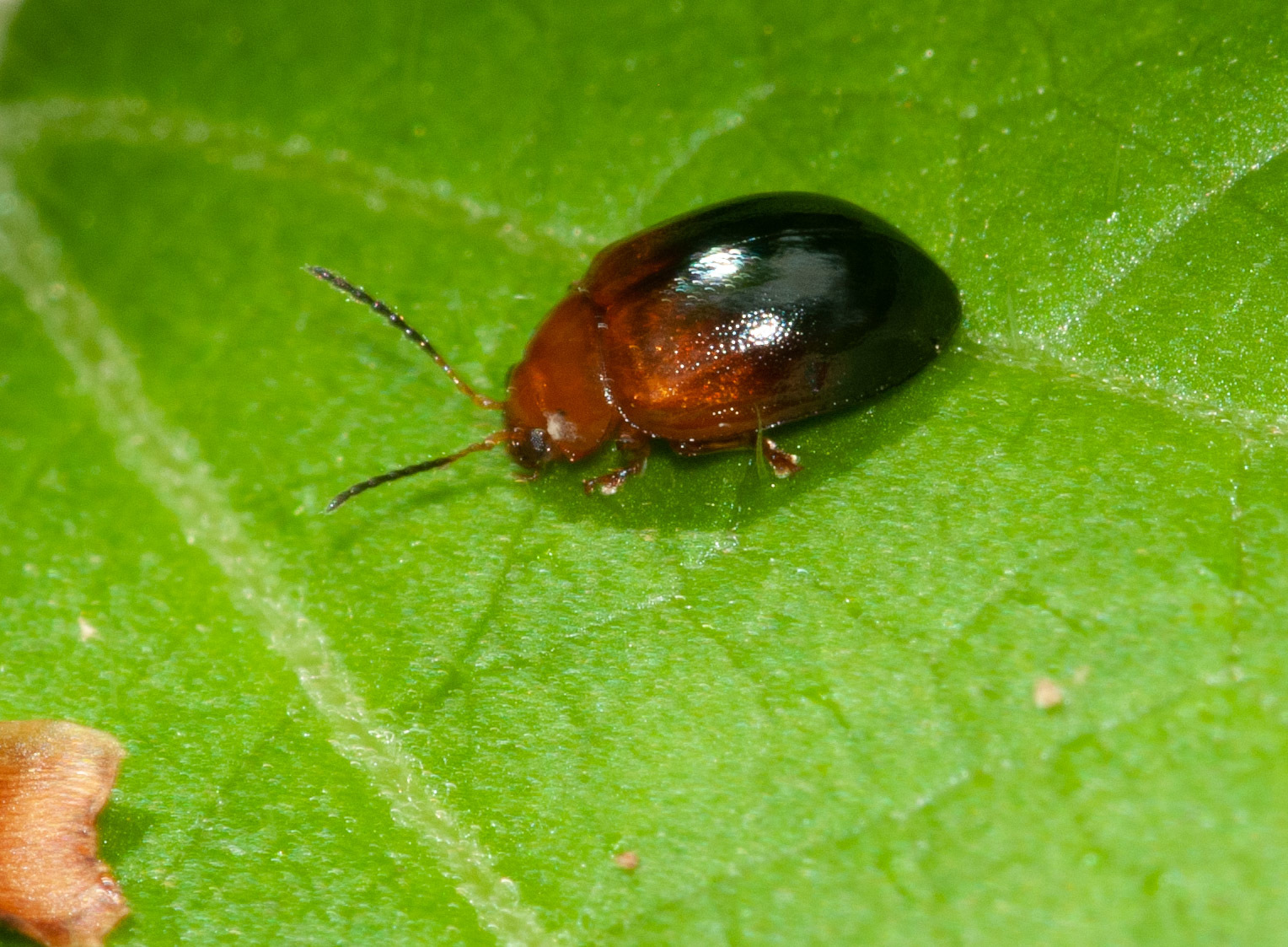

Scientific classification
- Kingdom: Animalia
- Phylum: Arthropoda
- Class: Insecta
- Order: Coleoptera
- Suborder: Polyphaga
- Infraorder: Cucujiformia
- Family: Chrysomelidae
- Genus: Nisotra
- Species: N. bicolorata

Binomial name
- Nisotra bicolorata (Csíki, 1940)

= Nisotra bicolorata =

Species of flea beetle

Nisotra bicolorata is a species of flea beetle in the family Chrysomelidae found in Australia. Coleopterologist Ernő Csíki discovered and first described the beetle in 1940. As the scientific name suggests, N. bicolarata is two-colored, with its top half reddish-brown and its bottom half black. The beetle feeds on Hibiscus tiliaceus, also known as native hibiscus.
