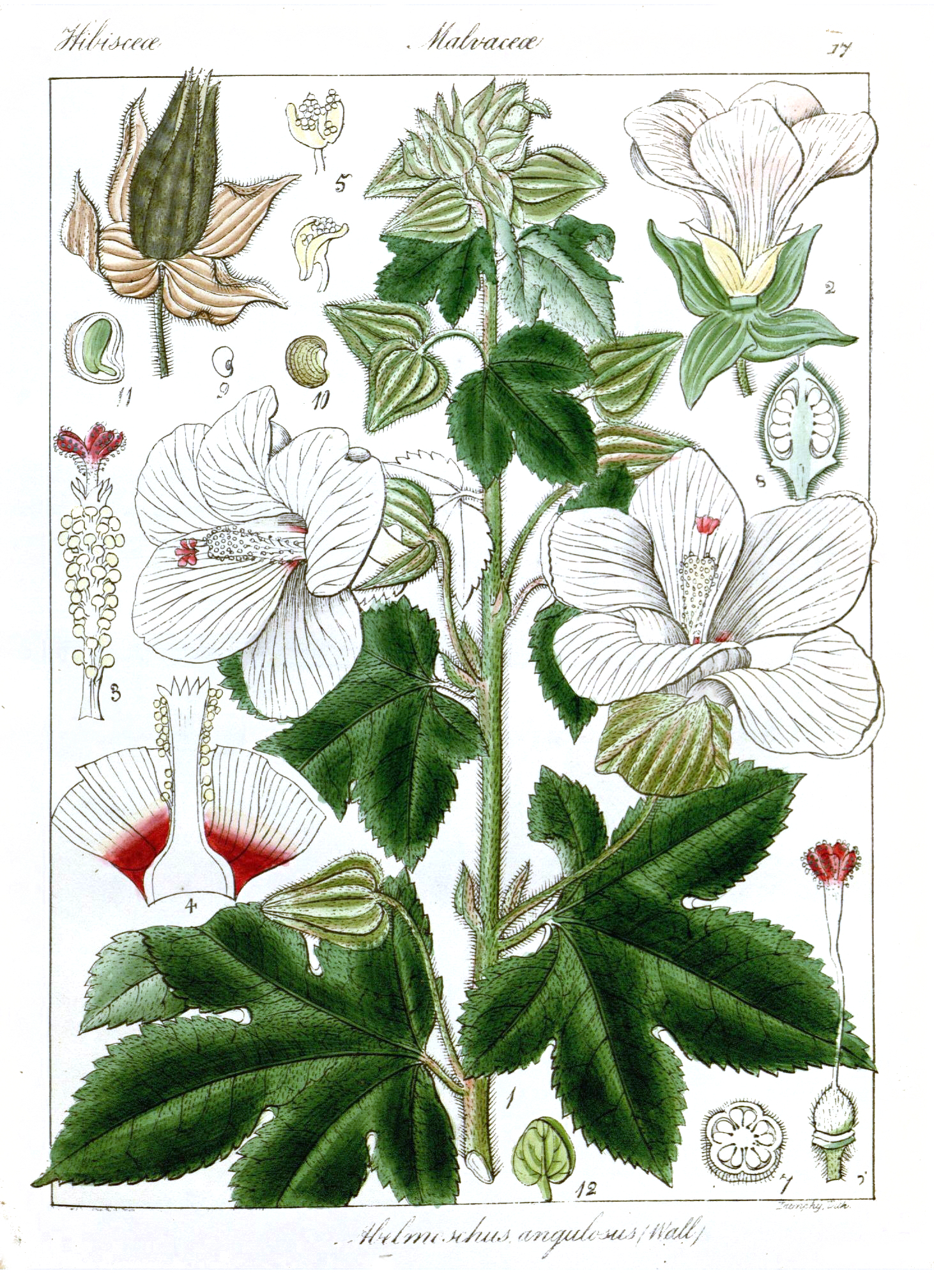

Conservation status
- Least Concern (IUCN 3.1)

Scientific classification
- Kingdom: Plantae
- Clade: Tracheophytes
- Clade: Angiosperms
- Clade: Eudicots
- Clade: Rosids
- Order: Malvales
- Family: Malvaceae
- Genus: Abelmoschus
- Species: A. angulosus

Binomial name
- Abelmoschus angulosus Wall. ex Wight & Arn.

Synonyms
- Homotypic synonyms: Hibiscus angulosus (Wall. ex Wight & Arn.) Steud. ex Mast.; Heterotypic synonyms: Abelmoschus angulosus var. grandiflorus Thwaites; Abelmoschus angulosus var. mahendragiriensis R.C.Misra; Abelmoschus angulosus var. purpureus Thwaites; Hibiscus angulosus var. grandiflorus (Thwaites) Mast.; Hibiscus angulosus var. purpureus (Thwaites) Mast.; Hibiscus molochinus Alston; Hibiscus primulinus Alston; Hibiscus setinervis Dunn; Hymenocalyx variabilis Zenker

= Abelmoschus angulosus =

Species of flowering plant

Abelmoschus angulosus is a plant species in the family Malvaceae, found in the Indian subcontinent, Cambodia, Laos, Vietnam and Indonesia. It grows in temperate and wet regions between 750 and 2000 m, and is the only wild species of the genus Abelmoschus with a notable tolerance to low temperatures and light frost.

== Taxonomy ==
Abelmoschus angulosus was first described by the Scottish botanists Robert Wight and George Arnott Walker Arnott in 1834. The description was based on two specimens collected in the "Neelgherries", an obscure reference to the Nilgiri Mountains in South India. One of the specimens was collected by the Danish botanist Nathaniel Wallich and the other was collected by Wight. Wallich invalidly published a name (without a description) for his specimen in 1829. The name Bamia angulosa Wall. is a homotypic synonym of Abelmoschus angulosus Wall. ex Wight & Arn.

== Bibliography ==
- Wallich, Nathaniel (1829). A Numerical List of dried specimens of plants in the East India Company's Museum. London.
- Wight, Robert; Walker-Arnott, George Arnott (1834). Prodromus Florae Peninsulae Indiae Orientalis. Vol. 1. London: Parbury, Allen & Co.
