= Okura =

Okura or Ōkura may refer to:

- Okura Hotels, an international chain headquartered in Japan
- Ōkura River in New Zealand
- Ōkura, New Zealand, a village
- Ōkura school of traditional Japanese comic theater
- Okura, Yamagata, a village in Japan
- the Japanese word for okra
- Yamanoue no Okura, a Japanese poet
