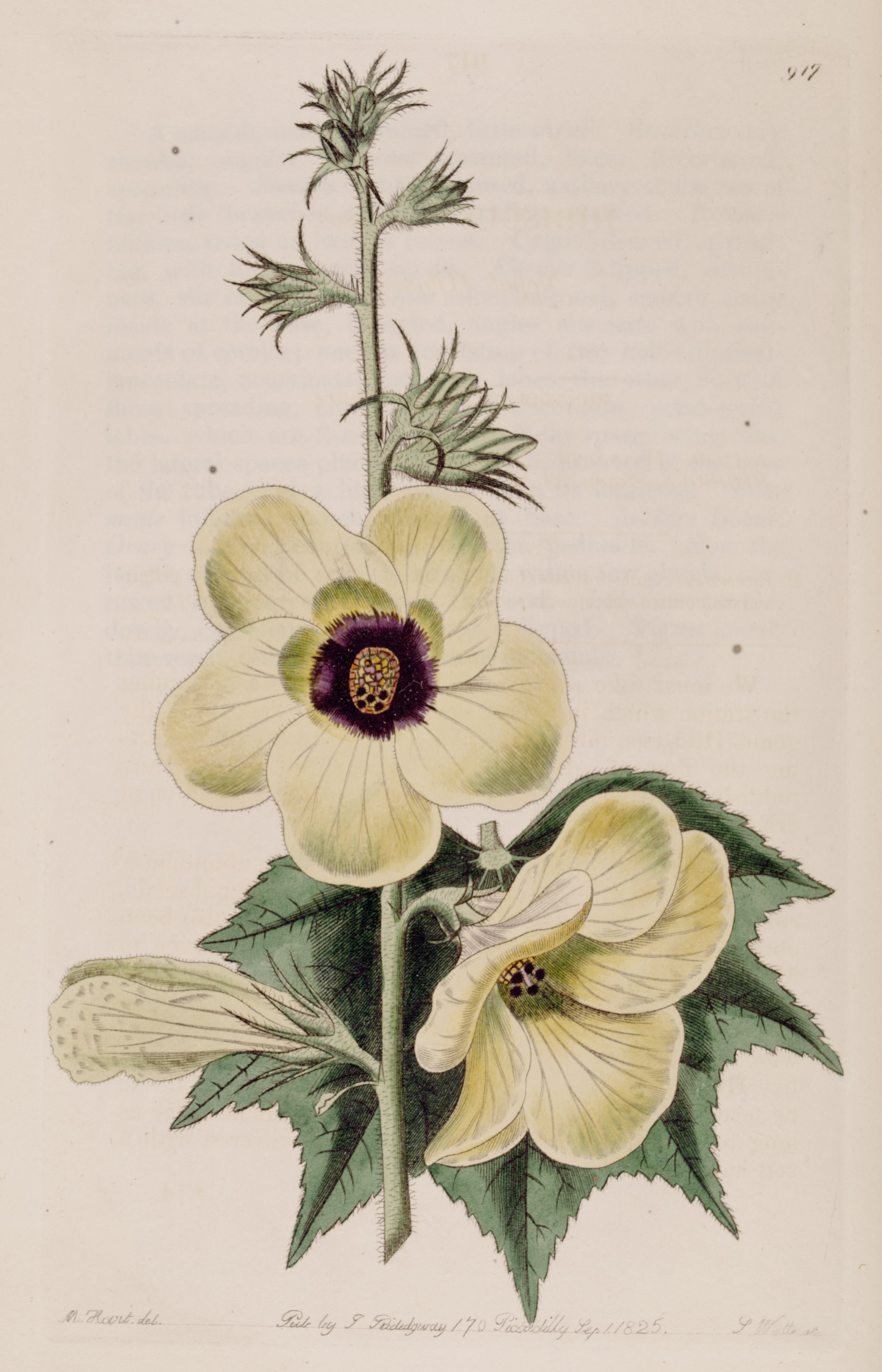

Conservation status
- Least Concern (IUCN 3.1)

Scientific classification
- Kingdom: Plantae
- Clade: Tracheophytes
- Clade: Angiosperms
- Clade: Eudicots
- Clade: Rosids
- Order: Malvales
- Family: Malvaceae
- Genus: Abelmoschus
- Species: A. crinitus

Binomial name
- Abelmoschus crinitus Wall.

Synonyms
- List: Abelmoschus cancellatus Wall. ex Voigt; Abelmoschus fusiformis Wall.; Abelmoschus hainanensis S.Y.Hu; Abelmoschus racemosus Wall.; Hibiscus bodinieri H. Lév.; Hibiscus cancellatus Roxb.ex G.Don nom. illeg.; Hibiscus cavaleriei H. Lév.; Hibiscus crinitus (Wall.) G. Don

= Abelmoschus crinitus =

Species of flowering plant

Abelmoschus crinitus is a species of flowering plant belonging to the mallow family. It was first described by Nathaniel Wallich in 1830.

== Habitat ==
Abelmoschus crinitus is native to China, the Philippines, India, Laos, Myanmar, Nepal, Thailand, Vietnam and Java. There have been a number of reports of the plant growing in Pakistan but its presence is rare. It is found in deciduous forests and on grassy slopes between 300 and 1300 m.

== Characteristics ==
Abelmoschus crinitus is a perennial shrub. Its stems grow up to 1 m tall. The leaves are "ovate-pentagonal" in shape with 3–5 shallow lobes and reach a maximum size of 8×7 cm. Stellate Trichome is present on both the upper and lower leaf surfaces, though it is more dense on the underside. The flowers are a "creamy-white to deep orange-yellow" colour and occasionally have a reddish centre. They have 5–6 bracts measuring 7–11 mm in length which are green when in flower and brown when in fruit.
