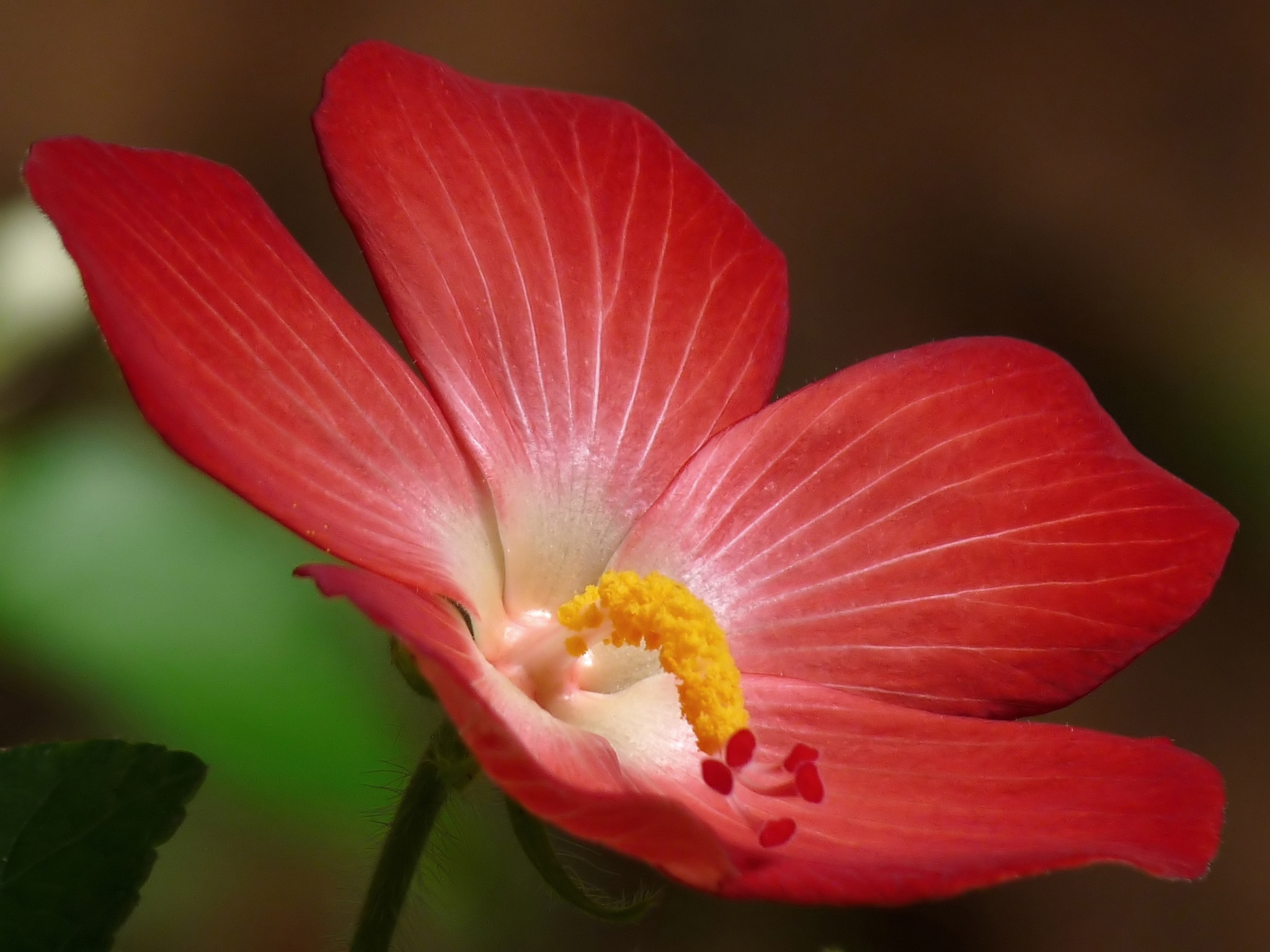

Scientific classification
- Kingdom: Plantae
- Clade: Tracheophytes
- Clade: Angiosperms
- Clade: Eudicots
- Clade: Rosids
- Order: Malvales
- Family: Malvaceae
- Genus: Abelmoschus
- Species: A. rhodopetalus

Binomial name
- Abelmoschus rhodopetalus F.Muell.

Synonyms
- Hibiscus rhodopetalus (F.Muell.) F.Muell. ex Benth.

= Abelmoschus rhodopetalus =

Species of flowering plant

Abelmoschus rhodopetalus is a species of flowering plant in the family Malvaceae.

== Description ==
Abelmoschus rhodopetalus is a perennial herb that typically grows 40–100 cm (16–39 in) tall, occasionally reaching up to 200 cm (79 in). The vegetative parts are densely pubescent.

== Distribution ==
It is native to tropical and subtropical Asia, extending eastwards to northeastern Australia, and is typically found in subtropical habitats.

== Uses ==
It is grown as an ornamental plant. In traditional Chinese medicine, the root is used as a tonic, the leaf is employed for toxin resolution and pus expulsion, and the fruit has been applied in softening the liver and nourishing the kidneys. In Vietnam, the plant is consumed as a health-benefiting food.
