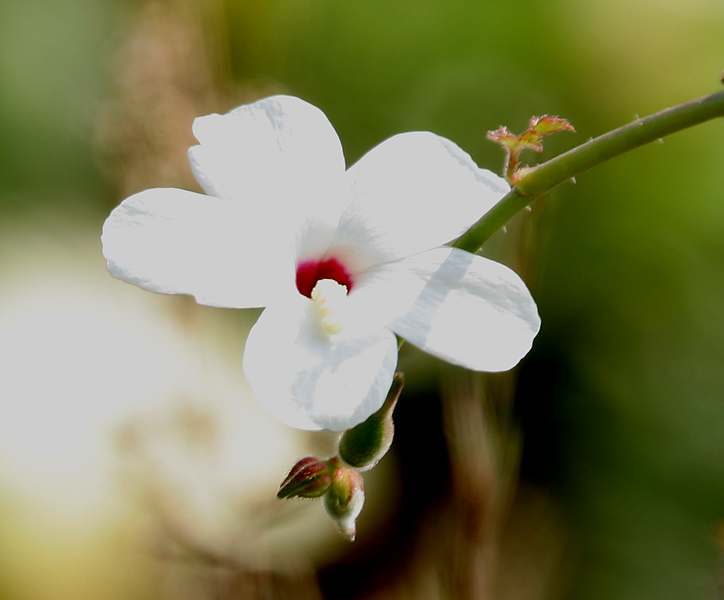

Conservation status
- Least Concern (IUCN 3.1)

Scientific classification
- Kingdom: Plantae
- Clade: Tracheophytes
- Clade: Angiosperms
- Clade: Eudicots
- Clade: Rosids
- Order: Malvales
- Family: Malvaceae
- Genus: Abelmoschus
- Species: A. ficulneus

Binomial name
- Abelmoschus ficulneus (L.) Wight & Arn.

Synonyms
- List: Hibiscus ficulneus L.; Abelmoschus alborubens Benth.; Abelmoschus alboruber F.Muell.; Abelmoschus strictus (Roxb.) Voigt; Hibiscus ficulneus var. alboruber (F.Muell.) Domin; Hibiscus mauritianus Spreng.; Hibiscus prostratus Roxb.; Hibiscus sinuatus Cav.; Hibiscus strictus Roxb.; Laguna aculeata Cav.; Laguna angulata G.Don; Laguna sinuata (Cav.) Hornem.

= Abelmoschus ficulneus =

Species of flowering plant

Abelmoschus ficulneus is a species of flowering plant in the genus Abelmoschus of the family Malvaceae. It is commonly known as the "white wild musk mallow" or native rosella, it is a fibrous perennial with a woody stem. Its flowers bloom about an inch in diameter with colors of pink or white, with a rose center; its leaves are palmate. It has traditionally been cultivated for its medicinal properties, and has shown some potential in studies for its immunologic effects.

This plant can be found mainly in north and East Africa, Madagascar, Indomalaya, and Northern Australia.

== Description ==
This plant matures into a compact upright shrub, growing up to 2 to 5 ft (1 to 2 m) tall and 2 to 6 ft (1 to 2 m) in width.

The leaves have a round, cordiform shaped base, with a width of 4 to 7 cm (2 to 3 in), and a length of 5 to 8 cm (2 to 3 in). Leaves are rough on both sides, toothed, and have 3 to 5 lobes.

Flower stocks are covered in velvety hair, and the flowers themselves are 5 to 7 cm (2 to 3 in) across. The stocks are short and colored white to pink with a dark purple center. Flowers last a few days. The plant has small hairs which may cause irritation. The plant's seed heads are hairy and sticky, oval in shape and 2.5–4 cm (1–2 in) long and 1.3–2 cm (1–1 in) wide, with five ribs and a short beak. Seed heads that are still in their growth period are medium to dark green, and when they are mature they turn dark brown, and split into five parts to release 10 to 20 brown to black spherical seeds, covered in tiny hairs. They grow in groups of flowers called inflorescences.

== Taxonomy ==
Abelmoschus ficulneus was first described as Hibiscus ficulneus by the Swedish botanist Carl Linnaeus in 1753. Linnaeus based his diagnosis on a specimen collected in Ceylon. The Scottish botanists Robert Wight and George Arnott Walker Arnott placed the species in genus Abelmoschus in 1833.

They are eudicots, characterized by their flower petals growing in groups of five parts. They have two embryonic leaves, which are also known as the cotyledon. In addition, their leaves are also veined. They are from the genus Abelmoschus, family Malvacea, and belong to the clade angiosperms, and are classified as magnoliophyta.

== Distribution and habitat ==
The species is native to north and East Africa, Madagascar, Indomalaya and Northern Australia, where it has become a common crop weed, particularly in cotton.

== Ecology ==
Abelmoschus ficulneus germinates in the spring and summer months, after the effects of rainfall and irrigation have set in. The plant grows rapidly over spring and summer several months after emergence, through autumn. Mature seeds are produced within a month of flowering in the late summer and autumn seasons.

== Uses ==
This plant can be cultivated for human use in medicinal treatments. This species has been used in traditional medicine for the treatment of sprains, toothaches, and bronchitis. In addition, studies also show that the oral administration of A.ficulneus can potentially increase antibody responses and contribute in furthering future research specific to treating diseases that affect the immune system. Research also shows that the root extracts of this plant can protect from drug-induced hepatotoxicity. This particular species consists of many antioxidant properties that can be cultivated to improve physical well-being. The rich source of oils and proteins in the seeds are responsible for the plants anti-oxidative properties.

== Gallery ==
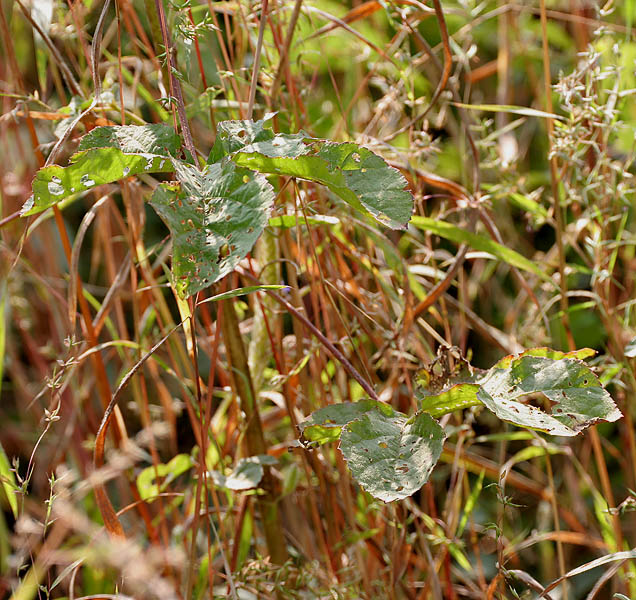
Leaves in Kawal Wildlife Sanctuary, India.

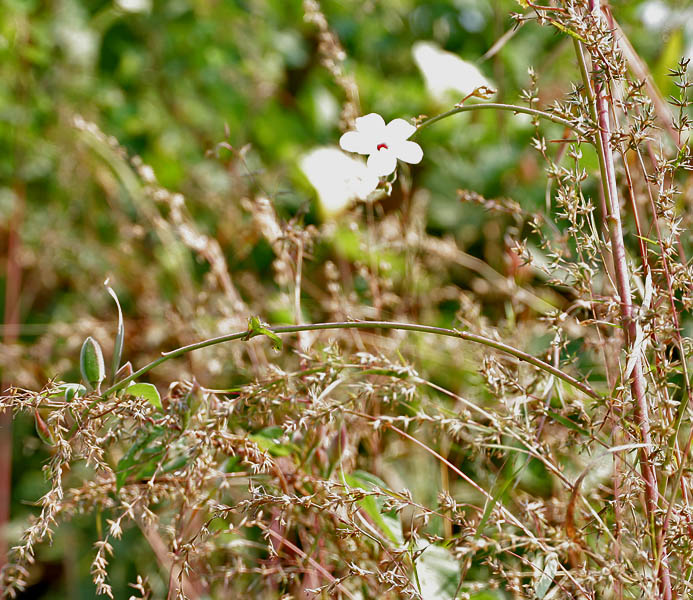
Leaves in Kawal Wildlife Sanctuary, India.

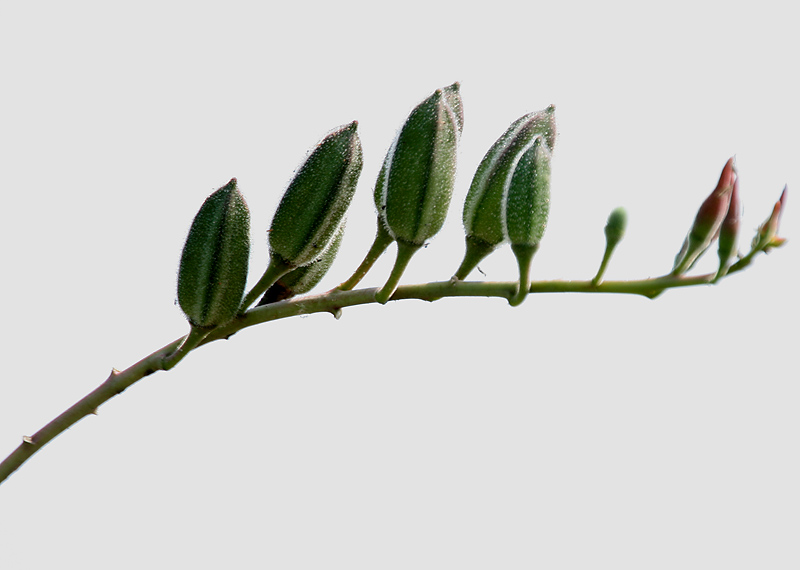
Fruit in Kawal Wildlife Sanctuary, India.

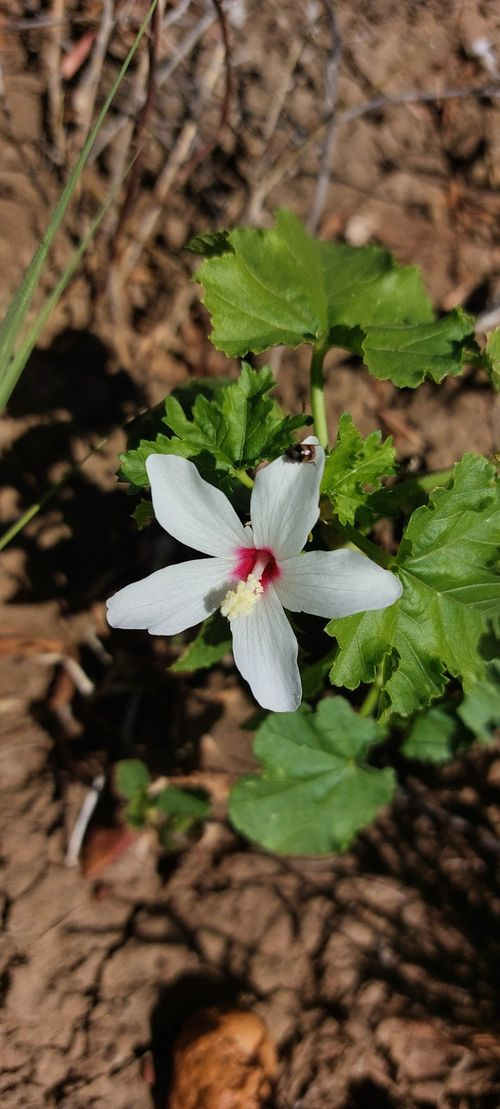
Flower in Corfield, Australia.

== Bibliography ==
- Linnaeus, Carl (1753). Species Plantarum: exhibentes plantas rite cognitas, ad genera relatas, cum differentiis specificis, nominibus trivialibus, synonymis selectis, locis natalibus, secundum systema sexuale digestas (1st ed.). Stockholm: Impensis Laurentii Salvii.
