= OCCRA =

Organized competition between the robotics teams of high schools

Oakland County Competitive Robotics Association
- Current season, competition or edition: OCCRA Over the Top
- Sport: Robotics-related games
- Founded: June 2000 in Oakland County, MI
- No. of teams: 17
- Most recent champion: Team 2960 - Automation Nation (OCCRA Block Chain)
- Website: https://www.oakland.k12.mi.us/stem/occra

Locations
- Map of Oakland County in Michigan

The Oakland County Competitive Robotics Association (OCCRA; /ˈoʊkrə/) is an organized competition among robotics teams of around 20 different high schools in Oakland County, Michigan. It was established in June, 2000 and takes place each fall, beginning in early September and ending in early December.

== OCCRA vs. FIRST Robotics Competition ==
Although OCCRA draws heavily from the FIRST Robotics Competition (FRC), OCCRA differs from FRC in several key ways. Firstly, the student members of the robotics teams are expected to design and build the robots without direct assistance from their adult mentors. This gives students more responsibility and allows them to develop leadership skills.

In OCCRA, teams are also forbidden from having corporate sponsorships. Each team is responsible for raising its own money to promote teamwork and to teach students to work within a budget. The league as a whole has corporate sponsors.

Furthermore, "heavy machinery" is restricted. Lathes and other types of precision machinery are not to be used in the construction of OCCRA-bound robots. Instead, students build their robots with rulers, hacksaws, and cordless drills. This rule is intended to ensure equality among teams with varying resources (e.g. having a machine shop in the team's high school or in a team member's garage).

One key way in which OCCRA does emulate FRC is that OCCRA maintains a policy of gracious professionalism.

== Teams ==
Over the years, there have been over 30 teams that have competed in OCCRA. Most of them are FRC teams, although there have been several OCCRA-only teams in the past. In addition, there have also been several teams that had started out as OCCRA teams before joining FRC.

=== Current OCCRA Teams ===
Below is a list of the teams currently competing in OCCRA as of 2026:

- Team 2 - Pandamonium
- Team 3 (4737 in FRC) - AtomiGators
- Team 33 - Killer Bees
- Team 51 - Wings of Fire
- Team 247 - Da Bears
- Team 308 - Monsters
- Team 469 - Las Guerrillas
- Team 573 - Mech Warriors
- Team 2137 - The Oxford RoboCats
- Team 2960 - Automation Nation
- Team 3098 (previously Team 97) - Waterford Robotics
- Team 5053 - Lakers
- Team 7178 - Yeti
- Team 7553 (previously Team 123) - OSTC Sweetbots
- Team 7692 - Beach Bums
- Team 7769 (previously Team 111) - The CREW (AM)
- Team 6977 - The CREW (PM)

=== Previous OCCRA Teams ===
Below is a list of teams that have competed in OCCRA in previous years:

- Team 1 - Juggernauts
- Team 9 - St. Mary's Preparatory
- Team 47 - Chief Delphi
- Team 62 - Birmingham Groves High School
- Team 65 - The Huskie Brigade
- Team 67 - The HOT Team
- Team 226 - Hammerheads
- Team 245 - Adambots
- Team 255 - Lamphere High School
- Team 302 - The Dragons
- Team 802 - Robo Knights
- Team 803 - More Monsters
- Team 915 - Eagles
- Team 1188 - Ravens (formerly known as Oaktown Crewz)
- Team 1213 - GROVES
- Team 1346 - University High School
- Team 3538 - RoboJackets
- Team 4384 - Benzene Bots

== See also ==
- FIRST
- FRC
