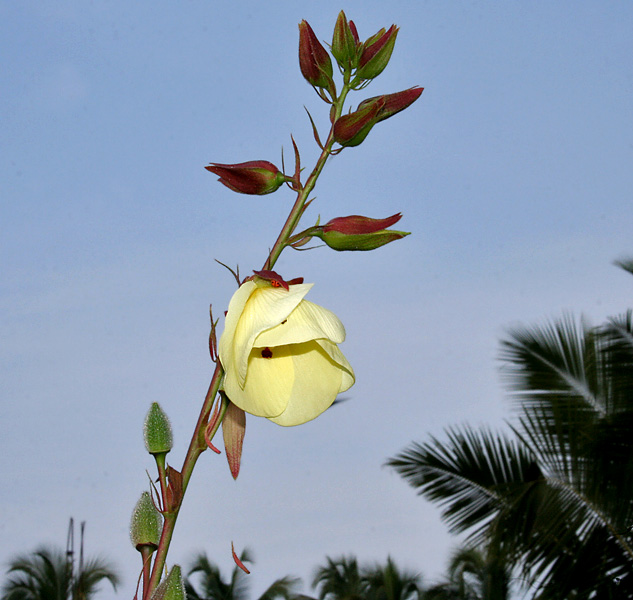

Conservation status
- Data Deficient (IUCN 3.1)

Scientific classification
- Kingdom: Plantae
- Clade: Tracheophytes
- Clade: Angiosperms
- Clade: Eudicots
- Clade: Rosids
- Order: Malvales
- Family: Malvaceae
- Genus: Abelmoschus
- Species: A. manihot

Binomial name
- Abelmoschus manihot (L.) Medik.

Synonyms
- List: Abelmoschus maculatus Bartl.; Abelmoschus manihot var. megaspermus Hemadri; Abelmoschus manihot var. timorensis (DC.) Hochr.; Abelmoschus pentaphyllus (Roxb.) Voigt; Abelmoschus platidactylus (Bakh.) Nakai; Abelmoschus pseudomanihot (DC.) Endl.; Abelmoschus venustus Walp.; Hibiscus bartlingianus Steud.; Hibiscus japonicus Miq.; Hibiscus manihot L.; Hibiscus papyrifer Salisb.; Hibiscus pentaphyllus Roxb.; Hibiscus pseudomanihot DC.; Hibiscus timorensis DC.; Hibiscus zenkeri Gürke

= Abelmoschus manihot =

Species of flowering plant

Abelmoschus manihot, commonly known as aibika, is a flowering plant in the family Malvaceae. It is also known as the sunset muskmallow, sunset hibiscus, or hibiscus manihot. It is a tropical subshrub or shrub native to Asia, New Guinea, and Queensland, Australia. It is cultivated and eaten as a leaf vegetable, among other uses.

== Description ==
Under favorable conditions, aibika can grow as a subshrub or shrub over 3 metres (10 ft) in height.

== Taxonomy ==
Abelmoschus manihot was first described as Hibiscus manihot by the Swedish botanist Carl Linnaeus in 1753. Linnaeus based his diagnosis on a specimen collected in India. The German botanist Friedrich Kasimir Medikus placed the species in genus Abelmoschus in 1787.

== Distribution and habitat ==
It is a tropical plant native to the Indian subcontinent, Indochina, central and southern China, Malesia, New Guinea, and Queensland.

== Cultivation ==
It is easily propagated through cuttings and relatively disease-resistant. As a result, it is widely cultivated and often found along garden borders or as an intercrop in traditional tropical gardens. Its growth habit, along with its nutritional value, contributes to its popularity in home gardening and horticulture.

== Uses ==
=== Culinary ===
Aibika is renowned for its highly nutritious properties. Its leaves are rich in essential vitamins, including a high content of vitamins A and C, as well as iron. Moreover, they contain approximately 12% protein by dry weight, making aibika a valuable dietary source.

In the Philippines, where it is known as lagikway among other names, the leaves are commonly incorporated into various dishes such as tinola, sinigang, pinangat, or used in salads.

In Indonesia, where it is known as daun gedi (gedi leaf), it is used in various dishes, most famously bubur Manado.

Aibika is the most popular and commonly-consumed indigenous green leafy vegetable in Papua New Guinea.

=== Other uses ===
Apart from its culinary uses, aibika has additional applications in different cultures. Its mucilage is used in traditional papermaking. In Japan, it is known as tororo aoi and is utilized to produce neri, a starchy substance used in traditional Japanese papermaking (washi). Similarly, in Korea it is referred to as hwang chok kyu and plays a role in making dak pul, an ingredient used in the production of hanji, Korean paper.

== Chemical constituents ==
A chromatographic and spectroscopic analysis published in China Journal of Chinese Materia Medica revealed the presence of thirteen compounds in aibika. These compounds include myricetin, cannabiscitrin, myricetin-3-O-beta-D-glucopyranoside, glycerolmonopalmitate, 2, 4-dihydroxy benzoic acid, guanosine, adenosine, maleic acid, heptatriacontanoic acid, 1-triacontanol, tetracosane, β-Sitosterol, and beta-sitosterol-3-O-beta-D-glucoside.

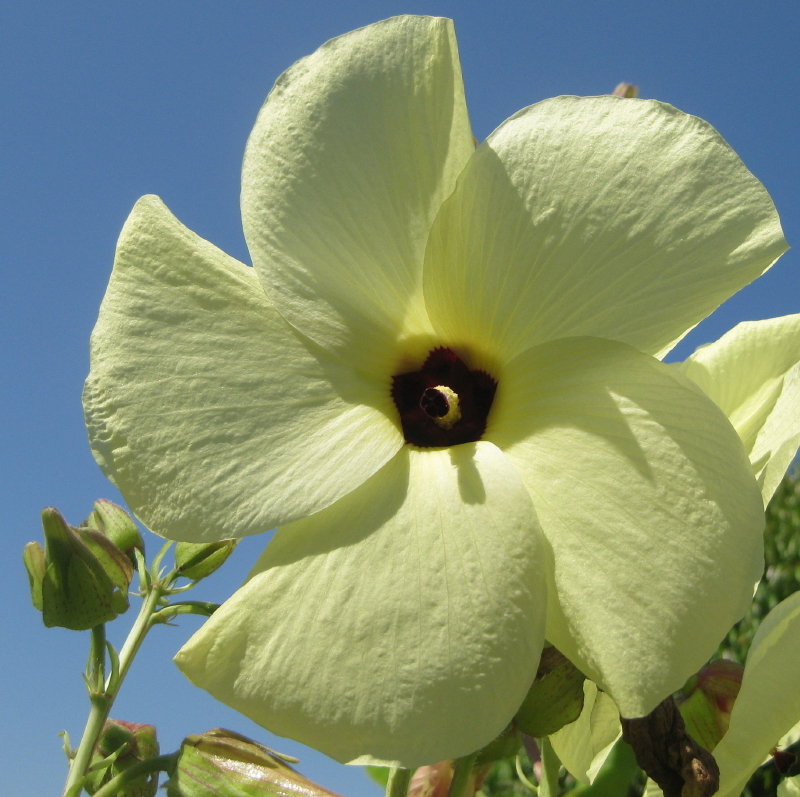

== Bibliography ==
- Linnaeus, Carl (1753). Species Plantarum: exhibentes plantas rite cognitas, ad genera relatas, cum differentiis specificis, nominibus trivialibus, synonymis selectis, locis natalibus, secundum systema sexuale digestas (1st ed.). Stockholm: Impensis Laurentii Salvii.
