= Friedrich Kasimir Medikus =

German physician and botanist

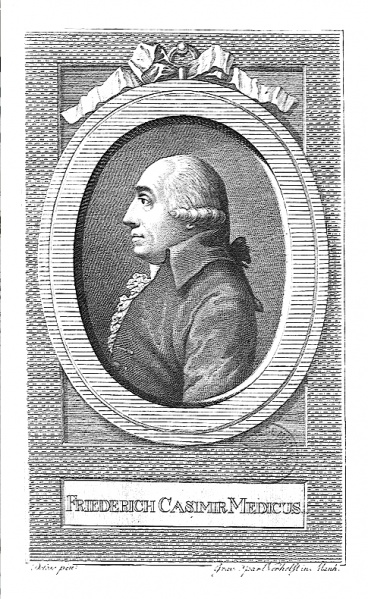
Friedrich Kasimir Medikus.

Friedrich Kasimir Medikus (or Friedrich Casimir Medicus), 6 January 1738 – 8 July 1808, was a German physician and botanist. The standard author abbreviation Medik. is used to indicate this person as the author when citing a botanical name.

== Biography ==
He was born at Grumbach and became director of the University of Mannheim (Theodoro Palatinae Mannheim) and curator of the botanical garden at Mannheim. He encouraged the cultivation of locust trees (Robinia) in Europe.

The genus Medicusia was named after him by Conrad Moench (now considered synonymous with Picris).
