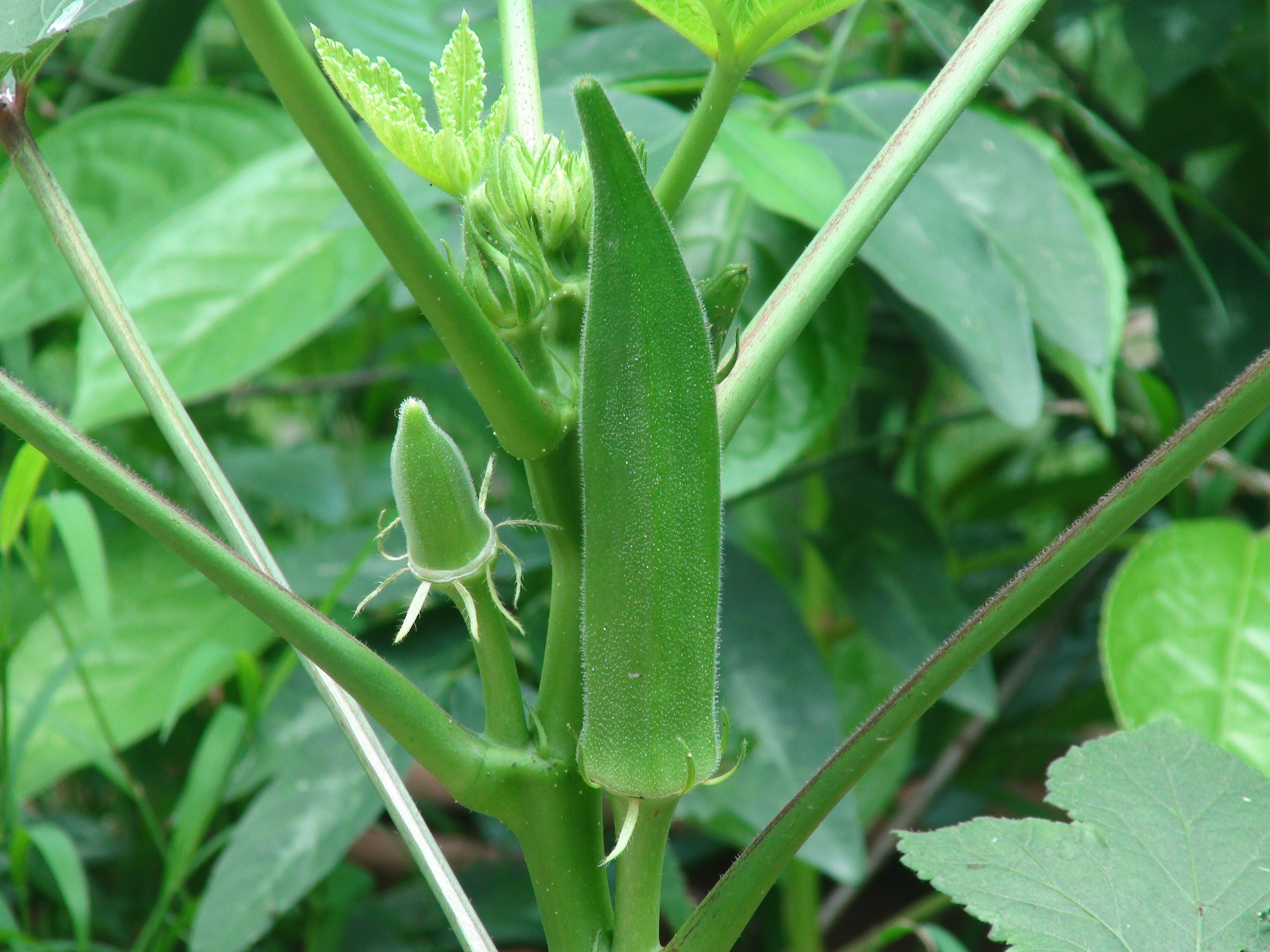
- Mature and developing fruits (pods) (Hong Kong)

Scientific classification
- Kingdom: Plantae
- Clade: Tracheophytes
- Clade: Angiosperms
- Clade: Eudicots
- Clade: Rosids
- Order: Malvales
- Family: Malvaceae
- Genus: Abelmoschus
- Species: A. esculentus

Binomial name
- Abelmoschus esculentus (L.) Moench

Synonyms
- Homotypic synonyms: Hibiscus esculentus L.; Heterotypic synonyms: Abelmoschus bammia (O.Targ.Tozz.) Webb; Abelmoschus longifolius (Willd.) Kostel.; Abelmoschus praecox (Forssk.) Sickenb.; Abelmoschus praecox var. hispidus Sickenb.; Abelmoschus praecox var. pubescens Sickenb.; Hibiscus bammia O.Targ.Tozz.; Hibiscus esculentus var. elongatus Berliand; Hibiscus esculentus var. praecox (Forssk.) A.Chev.; Hibiscus esculentus var. textilis A.Chev.; Hibiscus esculentus var. vavilovii Berliand; Hibiscus esculentus var. vulgaris Berliand; Hibiscus esculentus var. zhukovskyi Berliand; Hibiscus ficifolius Mill.; Hibiscus hispidissimus A.Chev.; Hibiscus longifolius Willd.; Hibiscus longifolius Roxb.; Hibiscus praecox Forssk.

= Okra =

Species of edible plant

Okra (US: /ˈoʊkrə/, UK: /ˈɒkrə/), Abelmoschus esculentus, known in some English-speaking countries as lady's fingers, is a flowering plant in the mallow family native to West Africa. Cultivated in tropical, subtropical, and warm temperate regions around the world for its edible green (red in some cultivars) seed pods, okra is used in the cuisines of many countries.

== Description ==
Abelmoschus esculentus is a perennial, often cultivated as an annual in temperate climates, often growing to around 2 metres (6 ft 7 in) tall. As a member of the Malvaceae, it is related to such species as cotton, cocoa, and hibiscus. The leaves are 10–20 centimetres (4–8 in) long and broad, palmately lobed with 5–7 lobes. The flowers are 4–8 cm (1 5/8–3 1/8 in) in diameter, with five white to yellow petals, often with a red or purple spot at the base. The pollen grains are spherical and approximately 188 microns in diameter. The fruit is a capsule up to 18 cm (7 in) long with pentagonal cross-section, containing numerous seeds.

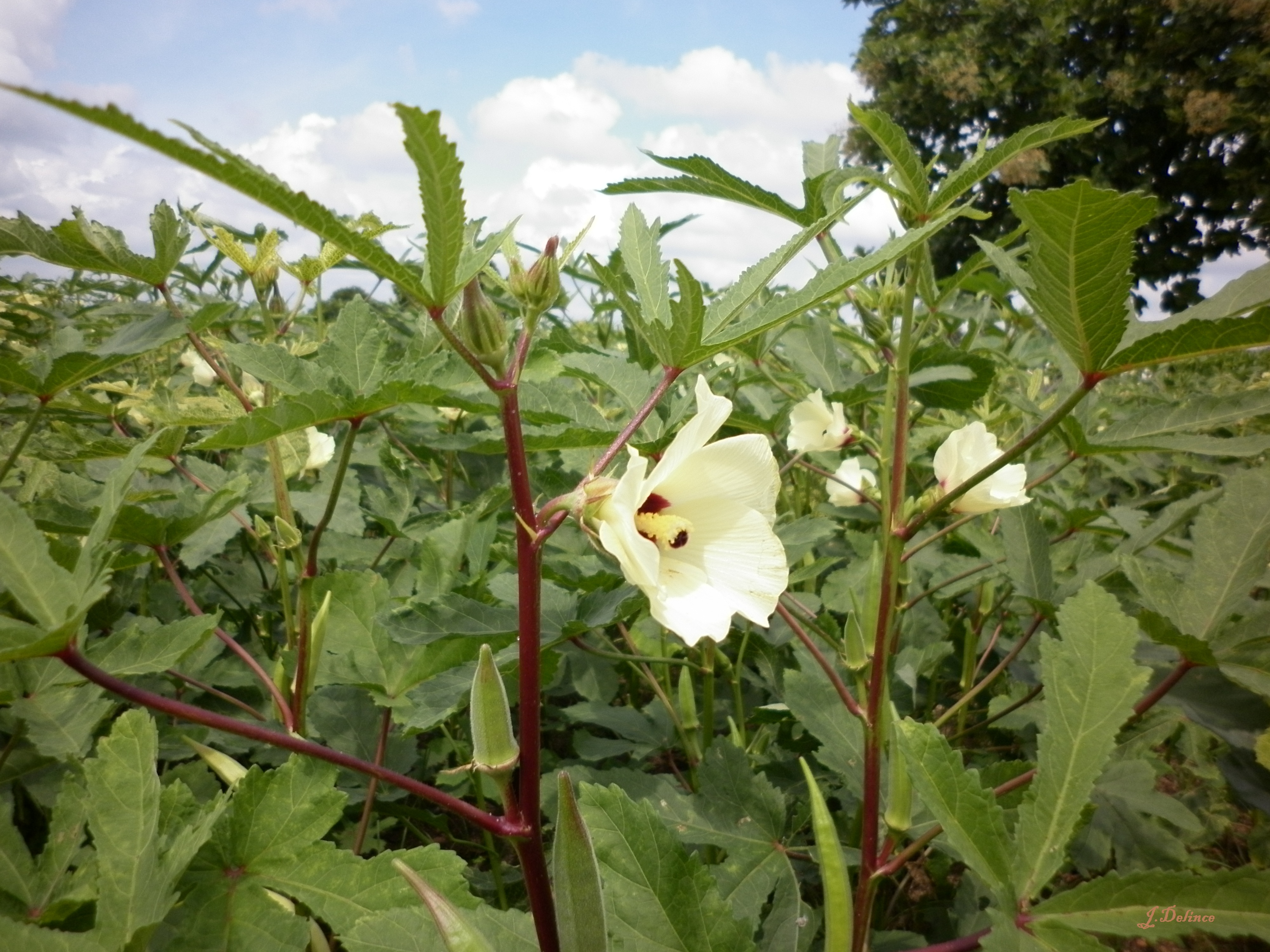
Whole plant with blossom and immature pod

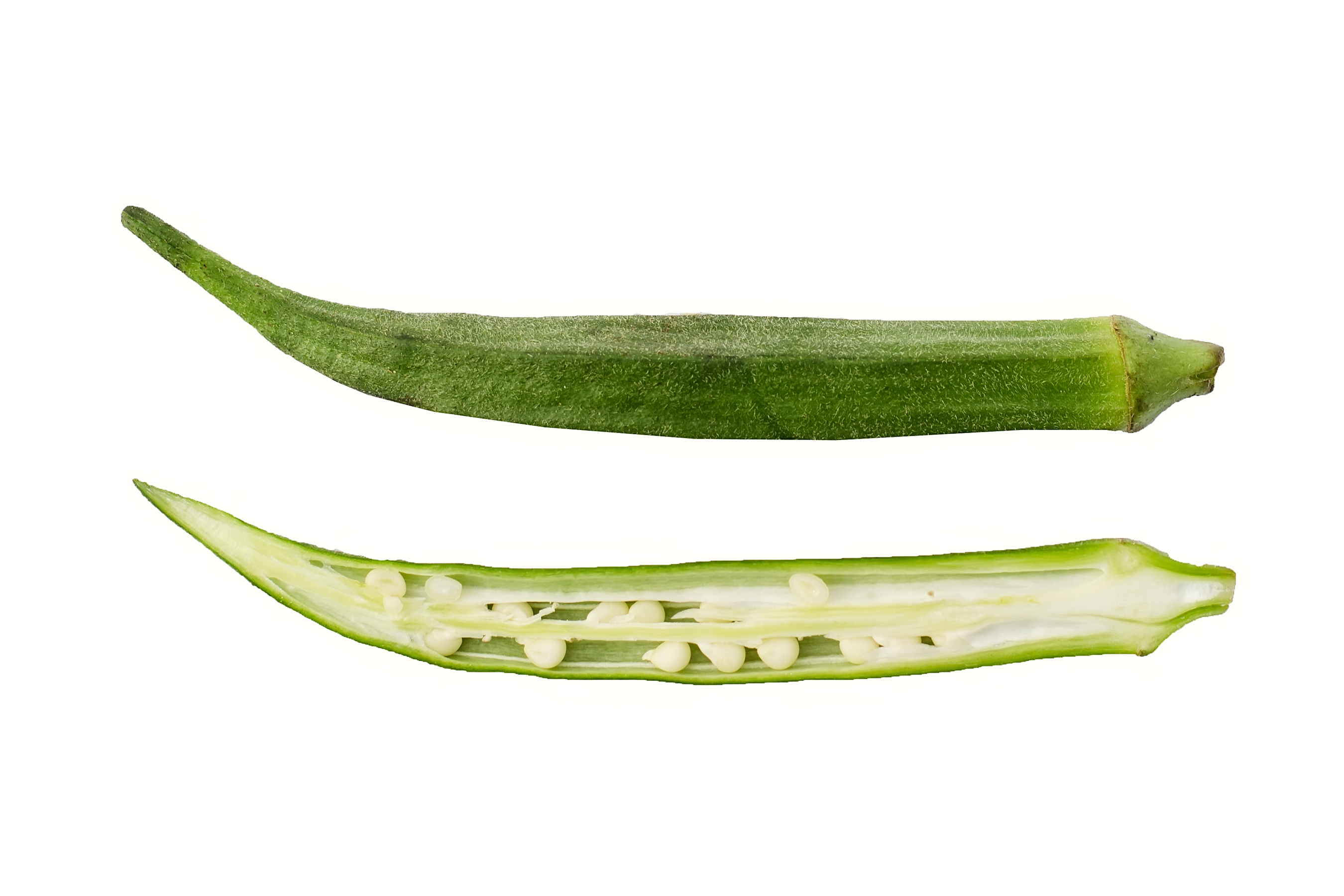
Longitudinal section of fruit

== Taxonomy ==
Abelmoschus esculentus was first described as Hibiscus esculentus by the Swedish botanist Carl Linnaeus in 1753. Linnaeus based his diagnosis on a specimen collected in India. The German botanist Conrad Moench placed the species in genus Abelmoschus in 1794.

=== Etymology ===
The word okra derives from a West African language, probably Igbo: ọ́kwụ̀rụ̀, appearing first in English in 1679 in the Colony of Virginia.

The scientific name can be broken down and translated: Abelmoschus is Neo-Latin from the Arabic (Arabic: أبو المسك, romanized: abu l-misk, lit. 'father of musk'), which was likely derived from the plant's seeds displaying a sweet, musky aroma when crushed; esculentus is Latin for 'edible' or 'being fit for human consumption'.

== Origin and distribution ==
Okra is an allopolyploid of uncertain parentage. However, proposed parents include Abelmoschus ficulneus, A. tuberculatus and a reported diploid form of okra. Truly wild (as opposed to naturalised) populations are not known with certainty, and the West African variety has been described as a cultigen.

Okra originated in East Africa in Ethiopia, Eritrea and eastern Sudan. From Arabia, the plant spread around the shores of the Mediterranean Sea and eastward. Okra was introduced to Europe by the Umayyad conquest of Hispania. One of the earliest accounts is by Abu al-Abbas al-Nabati, who visited Ayyubid Egypt in 1216 and described the plant under cultivation by the locals who ate the tender young pods with meal.

The plant was introduced to the Americas by ships plying the Atlantic slave trade by 1658, when its presence was recorded in Brazil. It was further documented in Suriname in 1686. Okra may have been introduced to southeastern North America from Africa in the early 18th century. By 1748 it was being grown as far north as Philadelphia. Thomas Jefferson noted it was well established in Virginia by 1781. It was commonplace throughout the Southern United States by 1800, and the first mention of different cultivars was in 1806.

== Cultivation ==
Abelmoschus esculentus is cultivated throughout the tropical and warm temperate regions of the world for its fibrous fruits or pods containing round, white seeds. It is among the most heat- and drought-tolerant vegetable species in the world and will tolerate soils with heavy clay and intermittent moisture, but frost can damage the pods. In cultivation, the seeds are soaked overnight prior to planting to a depth of 1–2 cm (3/8–13/16 in). It prefers a soil temperature of at least 20 °C (68 °F) for germination, which occurs between six days (soaked seeds) and three weeks. As a tropical plant, it also requires a lot of sunlight, and it should also be cultivated in soil that has a pH between 5.8 and 7, ideally on the acidic side. Seedlings require ample water. The seed pods rapidly become fibrous and woody and, to be edible as a vegetable, must be harvested when immature, usually within a week of pollination. The first harvest will typically be ready about 2 months after planting, and the pods will be approximately 2–3 inches (51–76 mm) long.

The most common disease afflicting the okra plant is verticillium wilt, often causing a yellowing and wilting of the leaves. Other diseases include powdery mildew in dry tropical regions, leaf spots, yellow mosaic and root-knot nematodes. Resistance to yellow mosaic virus in A. esculentus was transferred through a cross with Abelmoschus manihot and resulted in a new variety called Parbhani kranti.

=== Production ===
Okra production 2023, millions of tonnes
India	7.16
Nigeria	1.87
Mali	0.76
Sudan	0.30
Pakistan	0.30
World	11.52
Source: FAOSTAT

In 2023, world production of okra was 11.5 million tonnes, led by India with 62% of the total, and Nigeria and Mali as secondary producers. In the U.S. much of the supply is grown in Florida, especially around Dade in southern Florida. Okra is grown throughout the state to some degree, so okra is available ten months of the year. Yields range from less than 18,000 pounds per acre (20,000 kg/ha) to over 30,000 pounds per acre (34,000 kg/ha). Wholesale prices can go as high as $18/bushel which is $0.60 per pound ($1.3/kg). The Regional IPM Centers provide integrated pest management plans for use in the state.

Production of okra

Okra yield

== Uses ==
=== Culinary ===
Okra is one of three thickeners that may be used in gumbo soup from Louisiana. Fried okra is a dish from the Cuisine of the Southern United States. In Cuba and Puerto Rico, the vegetable is referred to as quimbombó, and is used in dishes such as quimbombó guisado (stewed okra), a dish similar to gumbo. It is also used in traditional dishes in the Dominican Republic, where it is called molondrón. In Brazil, it is an important component of several regional dishes, such as caruru, made with shrimp, in the Northeastern region, and frango com quiabo (chicken with okra) and carne refogada com quiabo (stewed meat with okra) in Minas Gerais.

In South Asia, the pods are used in many spicy vegetable preparations as well as cooked with beef, mutton, lamb and chicken.

In Greek cuisine, okra is cooked in tomato sauce with potatoes, often accompanying chicken or lamb.

==== Pods ====
The pods of the plant are mucilaginous, resulting in the characteristic "goo" or slime when the seed pods are cooked; the mucilage contains soluble fiber. One possible way to de-slime okra is to cook it with an acidic food, such as tomatoes, to minimize the mucilage. Pods are cooked, pickled, eaten raw, or included in salads. Okra may be used in developing countries to mitigate malnutrition and alleviate food insecurity.

==== Leaves and seeds ====
Young okra leaves may be cooked similarly to the greens of beets or dandelions, or used in salads. Okra seeds may be roasted and ground to form a caffeine-free substitute for coffee. When importation of coffee was disrupted by the American Civil War in 1861, the Austin State Gazette said, "An acre of okra will produce seed enough to furnish a plantation with coffee in every way equal to that imported from Rio."

Greenish-yellow edible okra oil is pressed from okra seeds; it has a pleasant taste and odor, and is high in unsaturated fats such as oleic acid and linoleic acid. The oil content of some varieties of the seed is about 40%. At 794 kilograms per hectare (708 lb/acre), the yield was exceeded only by that of sunflower oil in one trial.

=== Nutrition ===
Raw okra is 90% water, 7% carbohydrates, 2% protein, and has negligible fat (table). In a reference amount of 100 g (3.5 oz), raw okra supplies 33 calories, and is a rich source (20% or more of the Daily Value, DV) of vitamin C and vitamin K (table). It has moderate content (10–19% DV) of thiamine, folate, magnesium, and potassium (table).

Okra, raw
Nutritional value per 100 g (3.5 oz)
- Energy: 138 kJ (33 kcal)
- Carbohydrates: 7.46 g
- Sugars: 1.48 g
- Dietary fibre: 3.3 g
- Fat: 0.19 g
- Protein: 1.9 g
Vitamins and minerals
Vitamins	Quantity %DV^{†}
Vitamin A equiv.	4% 36 μg
Thiamine (B1)	17% 0.2 mg
Riboflavin (B2)	5% 0.06 mg
Niacin (B3)	6% 1 mg
Folate (B9)	15% 60 μg
Vitamin C	26% 23 mg
Vitamin E	2% 0.27 mg
Vitamin K	26% 31.3 μg
Minerals	Quantity %DV^{†}
Calcium	6% 82 mg
Iron	3% 0.62 mg
Magnesium	14% 57 mg
Phosphorus	5% 61 mg
Potassium	10% 299 mg
Zinc	5% 0.58 mg
- Other constituents: Quantity
- Water: 89.6 g
- Link to Full USDA Database entry
- ^{†}Percentages estimated using US recommendations for adults, except for potassium, which is estimated based on expert recommendation from the National Academies.

=== Folk medicine ===
An infusion of the immature pods or leaves may be used with intent as folk medicine to treat various illnesses.

=== Industrial ===
Bast fibre from the stem of the plant has industrial uses such as the reinforcement of polymer composites. The mucilage produced by the okra plant can be used for the removal of turbidity from wastewater by virtue of its flocculant properties. Having composition similar to a thick polysaccharide film, okra mucilage is under development as a biodegradable food packaging, as of 2018. A 2009 study found okra oil suitable for use as a biofuel. A 2025 study suggests that okra polymers, along with fenugreek, may be successful as treatments for removing microplastics from water.

== Gallery ==
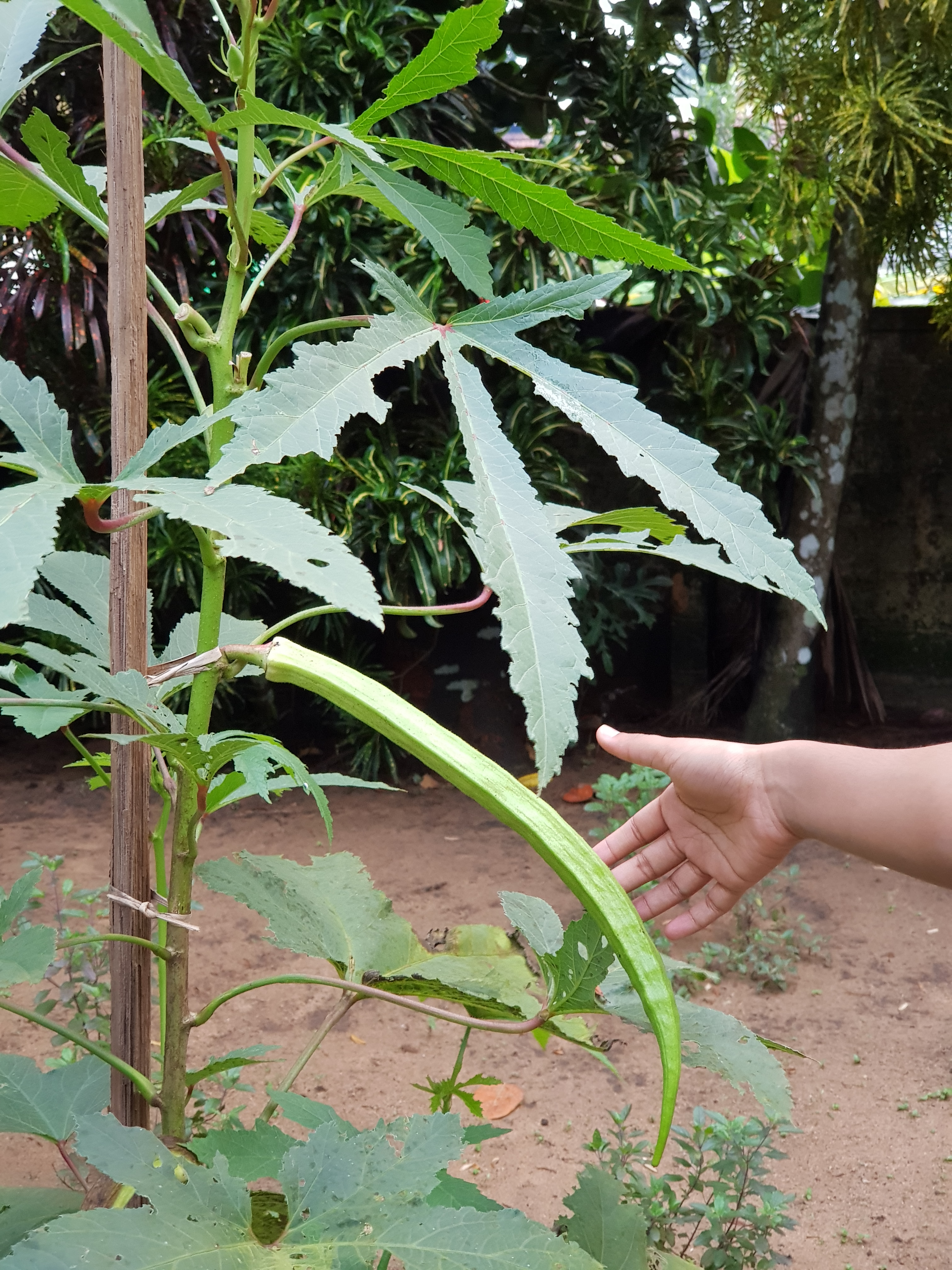
A giant okra pod

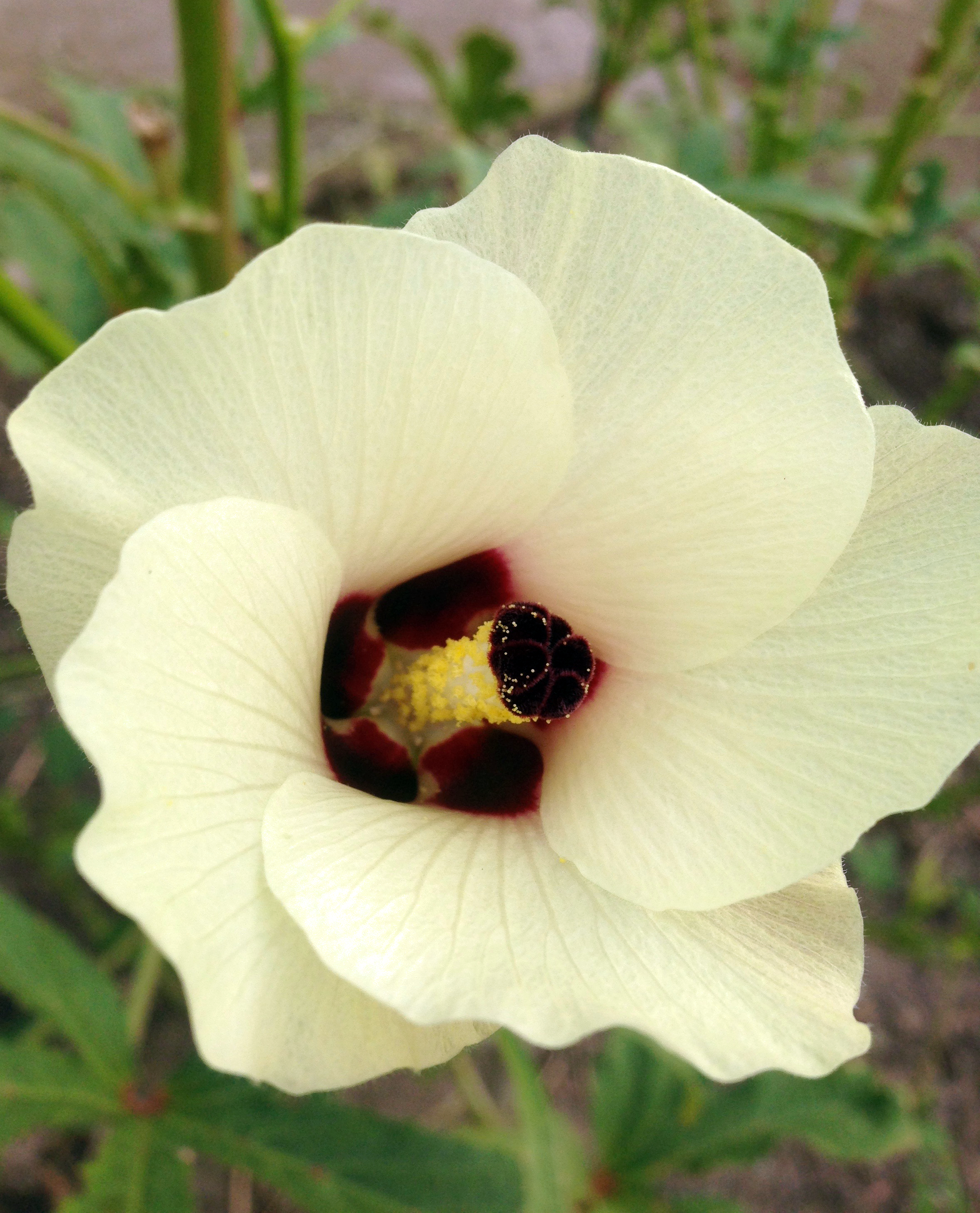
Flower close-up

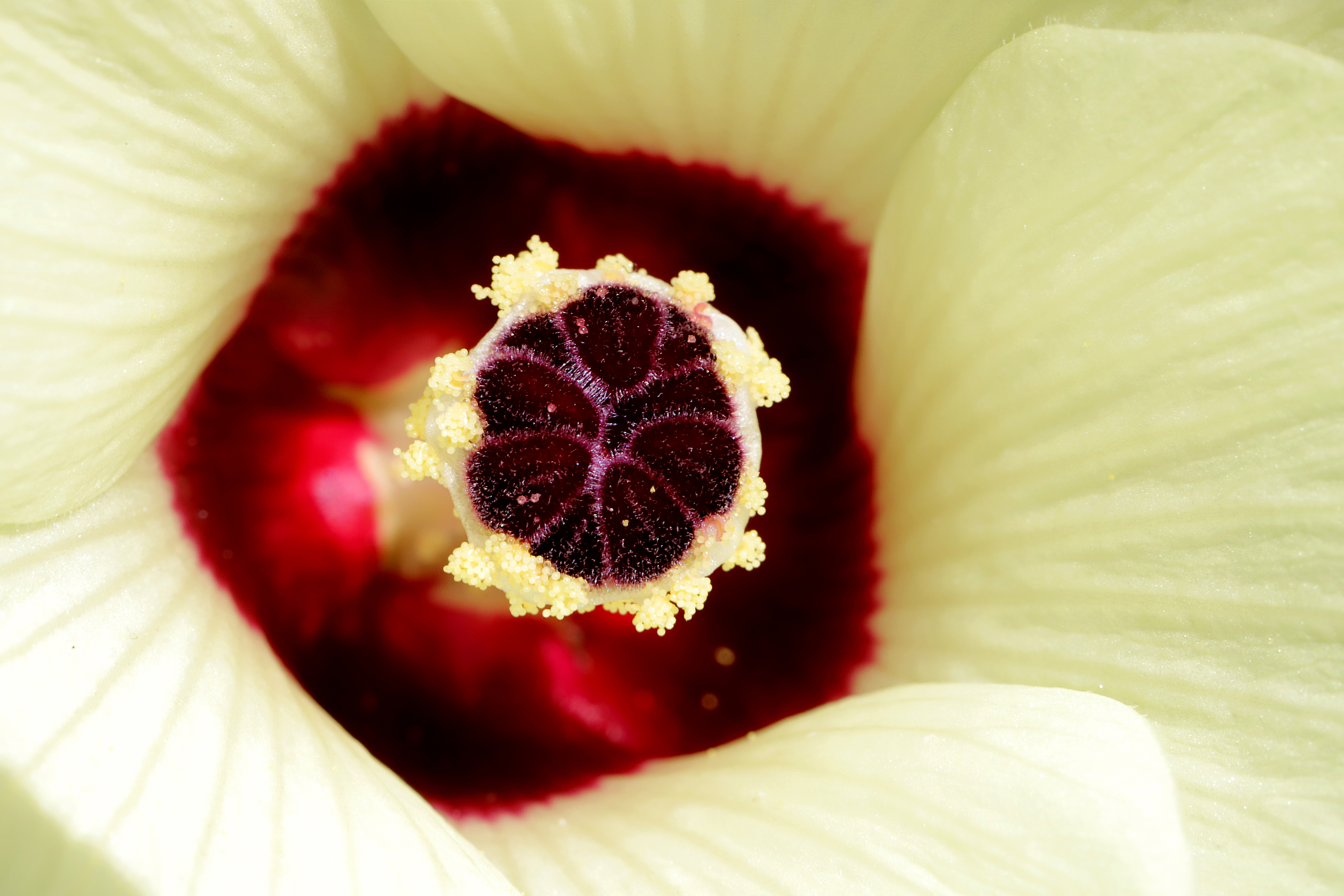
Stamen and pollen

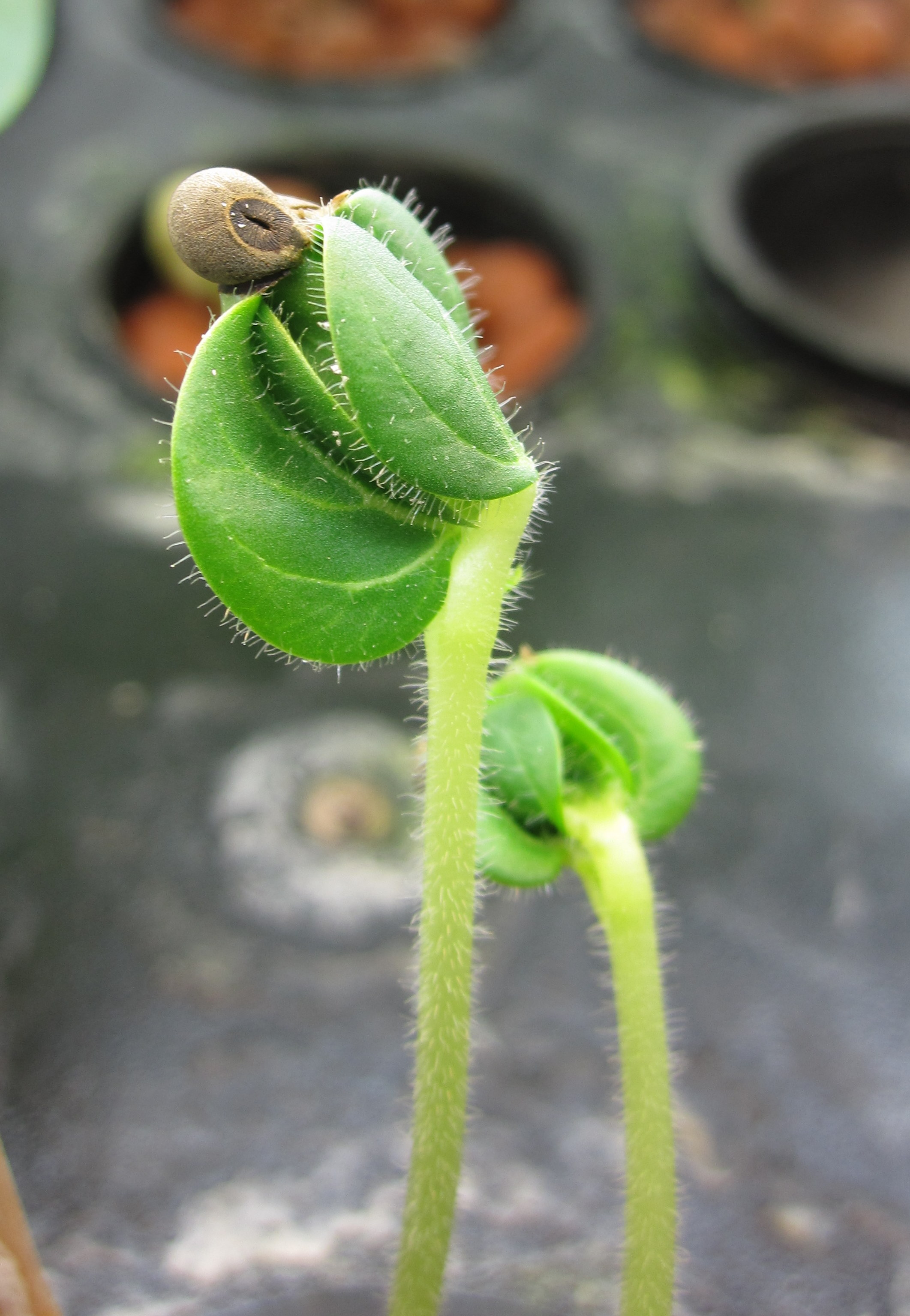
Young seedling showing cotyledons

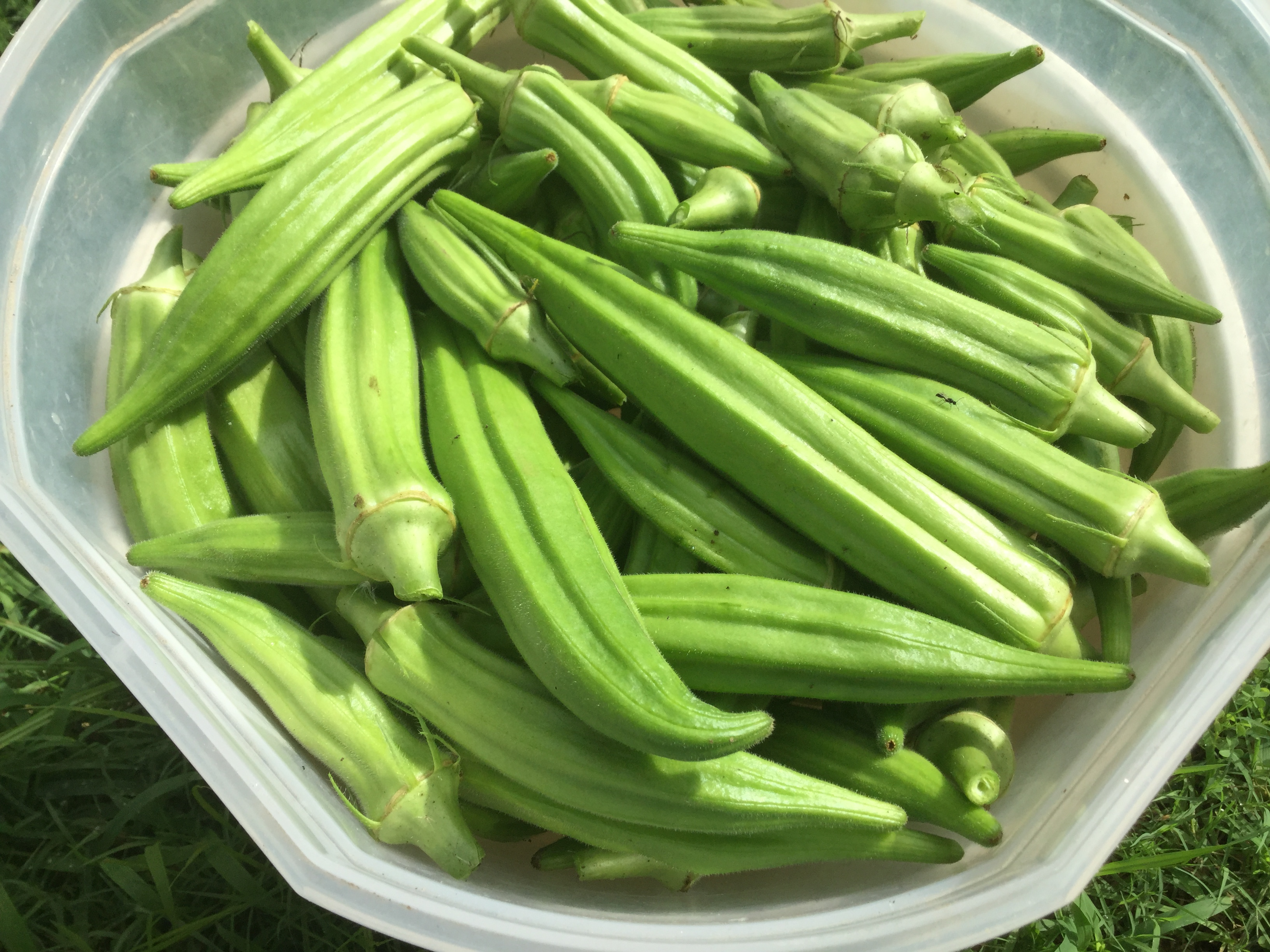
Fresh-picked fruits

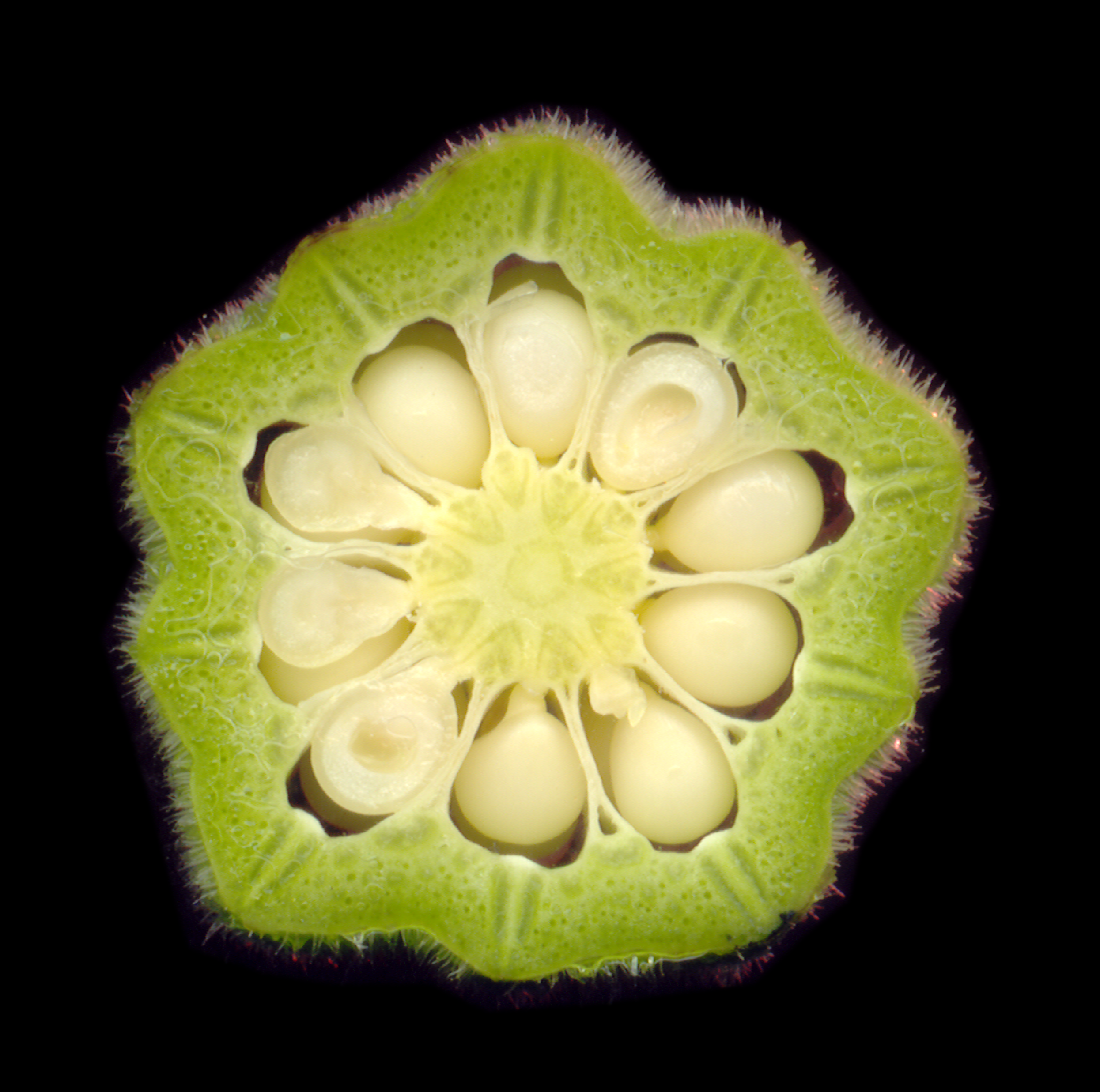
Cross-section of a pod

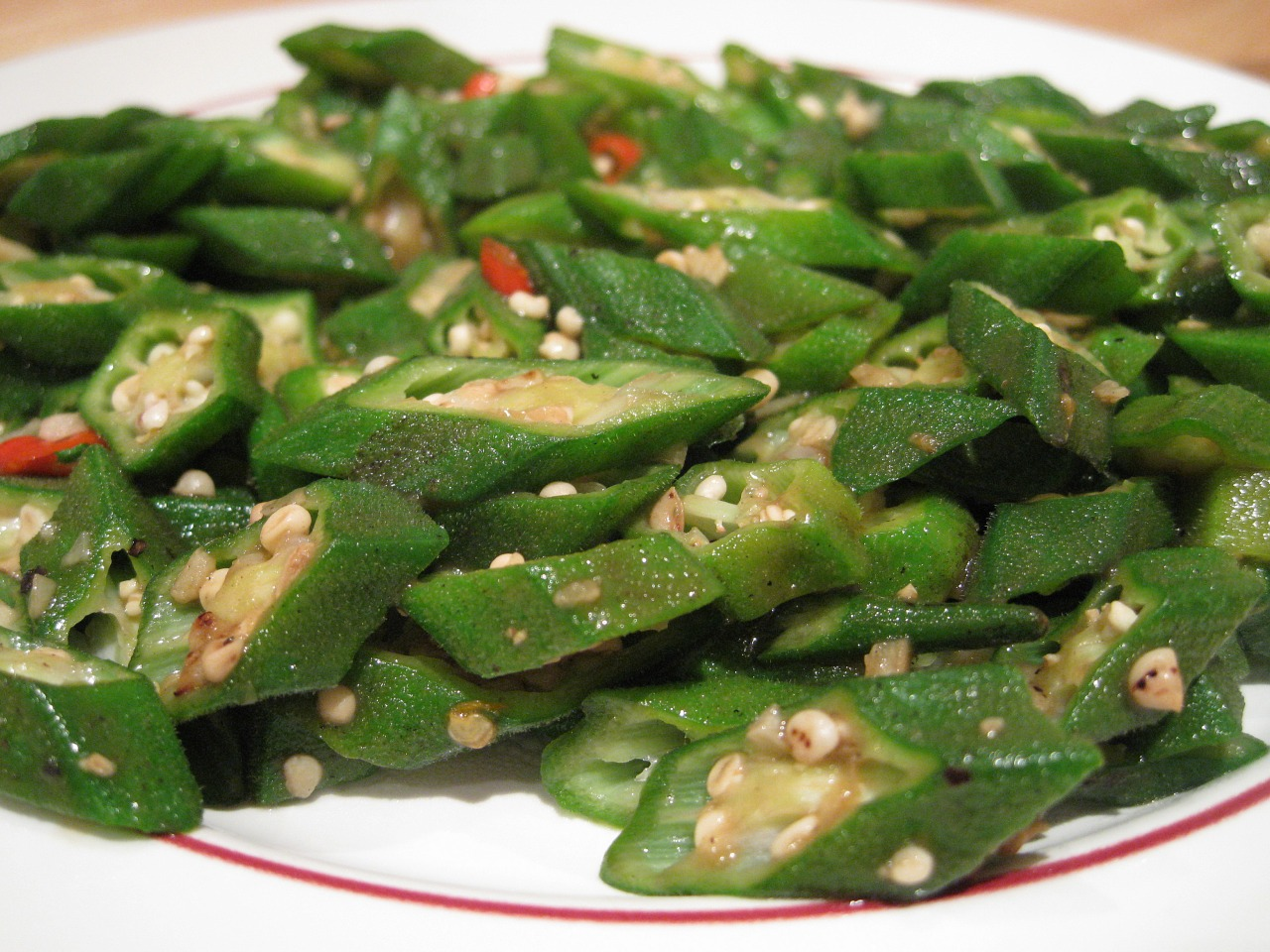
Stir-fried sliced okra fruits

== Bibliography ==
- Linnaeus C (1753). Species Plantarum: exhibentes plantas rite cognitas, ad genera relatas, cum differentiis specificis, nominibus trivialibus, synonymis selectis, locis natalibus, secundum systema sexuale digestas (1st ed.). Stockholm: Impensis Laurentii Salvii.
