= List of Phyllotreta species =

This is the list of species in the genus Phyllotreta, of which there are over 300 species worldwide.

- Phyllotreta acutecarinata Heikertinger, 1941
- Phyllotreta aeneicollis (Crotch, 1873)
- Phyllotreta aerea Allard, 1859
- Phyllotreta alberta Chittenden, 1927
- Phyllotreta albionica (LeConte, 1857)
- Phyllotreta arcuata E.Smith, 1985
- Phyllotreta armoraciae (Koch, 1803)
- Phyllotreta astrachanica Lopatin, 1977
- Phyllotreta asturica Heikertinger, 1941
- Phyllotreta atra (Fabricius, 1775)
- Phyllotreta attenuata E.Smith, 1985
- Phyllotreta austriaca Heikertinger, 1909
- Phyllotreta balcanica Heikertinger, 1909
- Phyllotreta bipustulata (Fabricius, 1801)
- Phyllotreta bisinuata E.Smith, 1985
- Phyllotreta brevipennis Chittenden, 1927
- Phyllotreta bulgarica Gruev, 1977
- Phyllotreta chalybeipennis (Crotch, 1873)
- Phyllotreta chotanica Duvivier, 1892
- Phyllotreta christinae Heikertinger, 1941
- Phyllotreta conjuncta Gentner, 1924
- Phyllotreta consobrina (Curtis, 1837)
- Phyllotreta constricta E.H.Smith, 1985
- Phyllotreta corrugata Reiche & Saulcy, 1858
- Phyllotreta crassicornis Allard, 1866
- Phyllotreta cruciferae (Goeze, 1777)
- Phyllotreta cruralis Abeille, 1895
- Phyllotreta dacica Heikertinger, 1941
- Phyllotreta decipiens Horn, 1889
- Phyllotreta denticornis Horn, 1889
- Phyllotreta diademata
- Phyllotreta dilatata Thomson, 1866
- Phyllotreta distincta Monnot, 1914
- Phyllotreta dolichophalla E.Smith, 1985
- Phyllotreta emarginata E.Smith, 1985
- Phyllotreta erysimi Weise, 1900
- Phyllotreta exclamationis (Thunberg, 1784)
- Phyllotreta fallaciosa Heikertinger, 1941
- Phyllotreta flavoguttata Kutschera, 1860
- Phyllotreta flexuosa (Illiger, 1794)
- Phyllotreta foudrasi Brisout de Barneville, 1873
- Phyllotreta fulgida Chittenden, 1927
- Phyllotreta gallica C.Brisout de Barneville, 1892
- Phyllotreta ganglbaueri Heikertinger, 1909
- Phyllotreta gillerforsi Biondi, 1991
- Phyllotreta gloriae Biondi, 1994
- Phyllotreta hemipoda Abeille, 1909
- Phyllotreta herbacea Chittenden, 1927
- Phyllotreta hispanica Pic, 1903
- Phyllotreta hochetlingeri Fleischer, 1917
- Phyllotreta iberica Heikertinger, 1911
- Phyllotreta inconspicua Chittenden, 1927
- Phyllotreta inordinata Chittenden, 1927
- Phyllotreta insularis Heikertinger, 1942
- Phyllotreta ispartaensis Gok, 2005
- Phyllotreta judaea Pic, 1901
- Phyllotreta lacerta Heikertinger, 1941
- Phyllotreta laticornis Chittenden, 1927
- Phyllotreta lativittata Kutschera, 1860
- Phyllotreta lepidula (J.L.LeConte, 1857)
- Phyllotreta lewisii (Crotch, 1873)
- Phyllotreta liebecki C.Schaeffer, 1919
- Phyllotreta lindahli Dury, 1906
- Phyllotreta melichari Heikertinger, 1941
- Phyllotreta nemorum (Linnaeus, 1758)
- Phyllotreta nigripes (Fabricius, 1775)
- Phyllotreta nitidicollis Weise, 1888
- Phyllotreta nodicornis (Marsham, 1802)
- Phyllotreta oblonga Chittenden, 1927
- Phyllotreta obtusa Chittenden, 1927
- Phyllotreta ochripes (Curtis, 1837)
- Phyllotreta ogloblini Shapiro, 1960
- Phyllotreta oregonensis (Crotch, 1873)
- Phyllotreta pallidipennis Reitter, 1891
- Phyllotreta parallela (Boieldieu, 1859)
- Phyllotreta perspicua Chittenden, 1927
- Phyllotreta polita Chittenden, 1927
- Phyllotreta pontaegeica Gruev, 1982
- Phyllotreta prasina Chittenden, 1927
- Phyllotreta praticola Weise, 1887
- Phyllotreta procera (Redtenbacher, 1849)
- Phyllotreta punctulata (Marsham, 1802)
- Phyllotreta pusilla Horn, 1889
- Phyllotreta ramosa (Crotch, 1874)
- Phyllotreta ramosoides E.H.Smith, 1985
- Phyllotreta randoniae Peyerimhoff, 1920
- Phyllotreta reitteri Heikertinger, 1911
- Phyllotreta robusta LeConte, 1878
- Phyllotreta rufitarsis Allard, 1859
- Phyllotreta rugifrons Küster, 1849
- Phyllotreta scheuchi Heikertinger, 1941
- Phyllotreta sholaksori Konstantinov & Moseyko, 2019
- Phyllotreta spatulata E.Smith, 1985
- Phyllotreta striolata (Fabricius, 1803)
- Phyllotreta subnitida Chittenden, 1927
- Phyllotreta temperei Doguet, 1974
- Phyllotreta tetrastigma (Comolli, 1837)
- Phyllotreta transversovalis Chittenden, 1927
- Phyllotreta ulkei Horn, 1889
- Phyllotreta undulata Kutschera, 1860
- Phyllotreta utana Chittenden, 1920
- Phyllotreta utanula E.H.Smith, 1985
- Phyllotreta variipennis (Boieldieu, 1859)
- Phyllotreta vilis Weise, 1888
- Phyllotreta viridicyanea Chittenden, 1927
- Phyllotreta vittigera Broun, 1893
- Phyllotreta vittula (Redtenbacher, 1849)
- Phyllotreta weiseana Jacobson, 1901
- Phyllotreta zerchei Doberl, 1998
- Phyllotreta ziegleri Lohse, 1980
- Phyllotreta zimmermanni (Crotch, 1873)
