= Barbarea australis =

Conservation status
- Critically endangered (EPBC Act)

Scientific classification
- Kingdom: Plantae
- Clade: Tracheophytes
- Clade: Angiosperms
- Clade: Eudicots
- Clade: Rosids
- Order: Brassicales
- Family: Brassicaceae
- Genus: Barbarea
- Species: B. australis

Binomial name
- Barbarea australis Hook.f.

Species of flowering plant

Barbarea australis, commonly known as native wintercress or riverbed wintercress, is a morphologically and ecologically typical Barbarea species with an unusual distribution: it is an endemic and threatened species from Tasmania. The leaves have a large end-lobe and only few side lobes, much like the leaf-shape of Barbarea stricta and Barbarea orthoceras. With regard to defence chemicals (glucosinolates), it is similar to other members of the genus.

== Cultivation ==
Although the plant remains critically endangered in the wild, Native wintercress is available for home garden cultivation. All above-ground parts of the plant are edible, with the leaves tasting similar to rocket.
