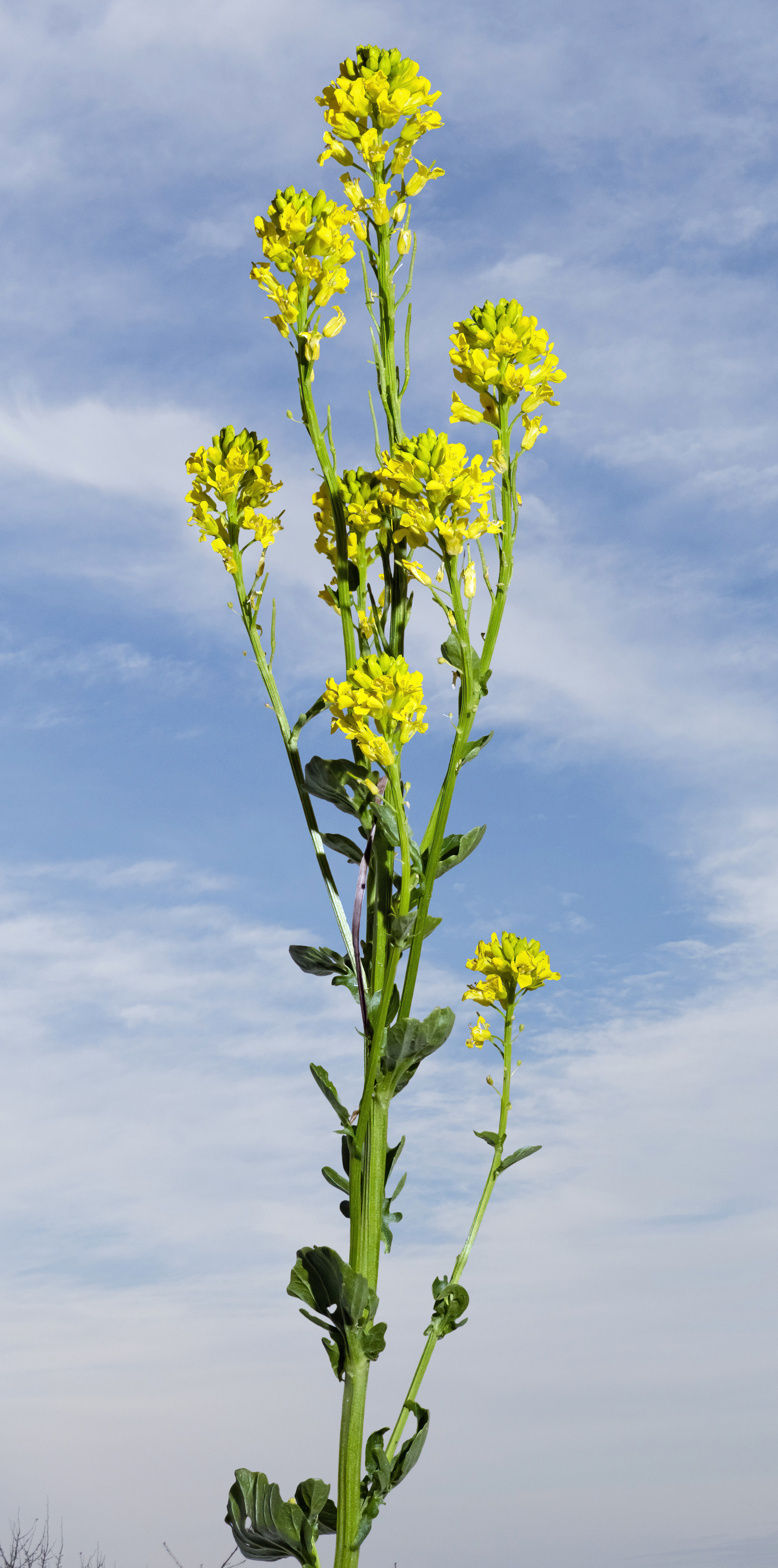

Conservation status
- Least Concern (IUCN 3.1)

Scientific classification
- Kingdom: Plantae
- Clade: Tracheophytes
- Clade: Angiosperms
- Clade: Eudicots
- Clade: Rosids
- Order: Brassicales
- Family: Brassicaceae
- Genus: Barbarea
- Species: B. vulgaris

Binomial name
- Barbarea vulgaris W. T. Aiton

Synonyms
- Cheiranthus ibericus Willd.; Barbarea ceretana Sennen; Erysimum barbarea L.; Erysimum arcuatu Opiz ex J. Presl & C. Presl

= Barbarea vulgaris =

Species of flowering plant

Barbarea vulgaris, called wintercress (usual common name), or alternatively winter rocket, rocketcress, yellow rocketcress, yellow rocket, wound rocket, herb barbara, creases, or creasy greens, is a biennial herb of the genus Barbarea, belonging to the family Brassicaceae.

== Description ==
The plant grows to 80 cm (31 in) high and 25 cm (10 in) wide. The stem is ribbed and hairless, branched at the base. It has basal rosettes of shiny, dark green leaves. The basal leaves are stalked and lyre-pinnatifid, that is with a large terminal lobe and smaller lower lobes. The cauline leaves are smaller, ovate, toothed, or lobed. The flowers are borne in spring in dense terminal clusters above the foliage. They are 7–9 mm (1/4–3/8 in) long, with four bright yellow petals. The flowering period extends from about April through July. The fruits are a siliques (seed capsules) of length 15–30 mm (5/8–1 1/8 in).

A single B. vulgaris plant can produce up to 88,000 seeds per year, its seeds are long lived, remaining viable for 10–20 years. Wintercress is also known to reproduce vegetatively from roots or buds near its base, presenting as cauline rosettes.

Chemical substances in this species include saponins, flavonoids, and glucosinolates. It usually has a peppery taste.

== Taxonomy ==
Formally, B. vulgaris was first published and described by William Aiton in his Hortus Kewensis (1812). Some references still mention Robert Brown as the author. Indeed, botanists believe that Brown was the actual author of the first botanical description of B. vulgaris in the description of the family Brassicaceae. However, W. T. Aiton, the publishing author, did not mention or indicate Brown's name for Brassicaceae; therefore, W. T. Aiton is author of the Brassicaceae novelties in this work.

B. vulgaris has various common names of which the most commonly used is 'wintercress', which can also be used for the entire genus Barbarea. Many other common names are listed in various sources, including (in alphabetical order), 'creases', 'creasy greens', 'cressy-greens', 'English wintercress', 'herb-Barbaras', 'rocket cress', and 'yellow rocket'. Two additional names sometimes used, 'bittercress' and 'upland cress' are ambiguous; the name 'bittercress' usually signifies various species of the genus Cardamine, and 'upland cress' usually signifies B. verna.

=== Etymology ===
The genus name Barbarea derives from Saint Barbara, the patron saint of artillerymen and miners, as this plant in the past was used to soothe the wounds caused by explosions. The species Latin name vulgaris means "common".

== Distribution and habitat ==
Native to Eurasia and North Africa, it is naturalised in many parts of North America and New Zealand as a weed.

=== Range ===
It is found in temperate North Africa within Algeria and Tunisia. Also in Asia, within Afghanistan, Armenia, Azerbaijan, the Caucasus, China (in the provinces of Heilongjiang, Jiangsu, Jilin and Xinjiang), Georgia, Iran, Iraq, Japan (in the provinces Hokkaido, Honshu, Kyushu, Ryukyu Islands and Shikoku), Kazakhstan, Kyrgyzstan, Mongolia, Siberia, Tajikistan, Turkmenistan and Turkey. It is also found in tropical parts of Asia, such as India, Pakistan and Sri Lanka.

In eastern Europe, it is found within Belarus, Estonia, Latvia, Lithuania, Moldova and Ukraine. In middle Europe, it is in Austria, Belgium, the Czech Republic, Germany, Hungary, the Netherlands, Poland, Slovakia and Switzerland. In northern Europe, in Denmark, Ireland, Sweden and United Kingdom. In southeastern Europe, within Albania, Bosnia and Herzegovina, Bulgaria, Croatia, Greece, Italy, Montenegro, North Macedonia, Romania, Serbia and Slovenia. Lastly, it is found in southwestern Europe, it is found in France, Portugal and Spain.

=== Habitat ===
The plant prefers fresh or moist places, on roadsides, along rivers, in arable land, wastelands and docklands, or on the slopes and in ditches, at an altitude of 0–2,500 m (0–8,202 ft) above sea level. In Britain, it can be found in hedgerows and the edges of woodlands.

It also prefers to grow in siliceous, calcareous, sandy, alluvial and clay soils.

== Ecology ==
=== Natural chemotypes with distinct ecology ===
A pubescent type (the "P-type") has been described from southern Scandinavia and Russia. While this chemotype is rare in Scandinavia, it seems to be dominant in Russia according to the only survey made so far. This type has atypical chemistry and is devoid of resistance to the diamondback moth and the flea beetle Phyllotreta nemorum. The P-type belongs morphologically to the variety B. vulgaris var. arcuata, but may also be identical to the variety originally described as Barbarea arcuata Rchb. var. pubescens N. Busch. In this context, the usual type of B. vulgaris var. arcuata is called the "G-type" (for glabrous (hairless) leaves). This type is reported to be dominant in Central Europe. On a genomic scale, more than 22.000 genes (89% of those tested) were found to have fixed differences between the two types.

A chemotype with deviating glucosinolate content has been described from Western and Central Europe and named the "NAS-type" (because it is dominated by the glucosinolate glucoNASturtiin. This type has increased resistance to some specialized insects. In this context, the usual chemotype of B. vulgaris is called the "BAR" type (because it is dominated by glucoBARbarin).

While the P-type and G-type differ in multiple genetic, chemical and morphological features, the NAS and BAR types seem to be a simple monogenic variation. For this reason, it has been suggested to refer to NAS and BAR forms (from the lowest botanical rank forma) and P- and G-types. Indeed, occasional NAS form plants in Central Europe were found to be G-type by a set of genetic markers.

=== Natural insect resistance ===
Most B. vulgaris genotypes are naturally resistant to some insect species that are otherwise specialized on the crucifer family. In the case of diamondback moth (Plutella xylostella) and the flea beetle Phyllotreta nemorum, the resistance is caused by saponins. Glucosinolates such as glucobarbarin and glucobrassicin are used as a cue for egg-laying by female cabbage white butterflies such as Pieris rapae. Indeed, the larvae of this butterfly thrive well on this plant. Diamondback moth females are also stimulated by these chemicals, but the larvae die due to the content of saponins which are apparently not sensed by the moths. This phenomenon has been tested for biological insect control: B. vulgaris plants are placed in a field and attract much of the diamondback moth egg load. As the larvae die shortly after hatching, this kind of insect control has been named "dead-end trap cropping".

=== Ecological impact ===
B. vulgaris is listed as a Class 3: Secondary Noxious Weed by the Canadian Food Inspection Agency due to difficulties preventing its small seed, 1.2–1.5 mm (0.047–0.059 in) long by 1.0–1.2 mm (0.039–0.047 in) wide, from contaminating seed stocks of other small-seeded crops, e.g. grain, hay and vegetables.

== Uses ==
The young leaves can be eaten raw or cooked. The buds and flowers are also edible, as are the flower shoots after cooking. It can also be used as a dead-end trap crop for diamondback moth, the caterpillar of which is a pest on cruciferous plants like cabbage.

== Subspecies ==
- Barbarea vulgaris var. arcuata (Opiz ex J. Presl & C. Presl) Fr.
- Barbarea vulgaris var. brachycarpa Rouy & Foucaud
- Barbarea vulgaris var. longisiliquosa Carion
- Barbarea vulgaris var. sylvestris Fr.

== Gallery ==
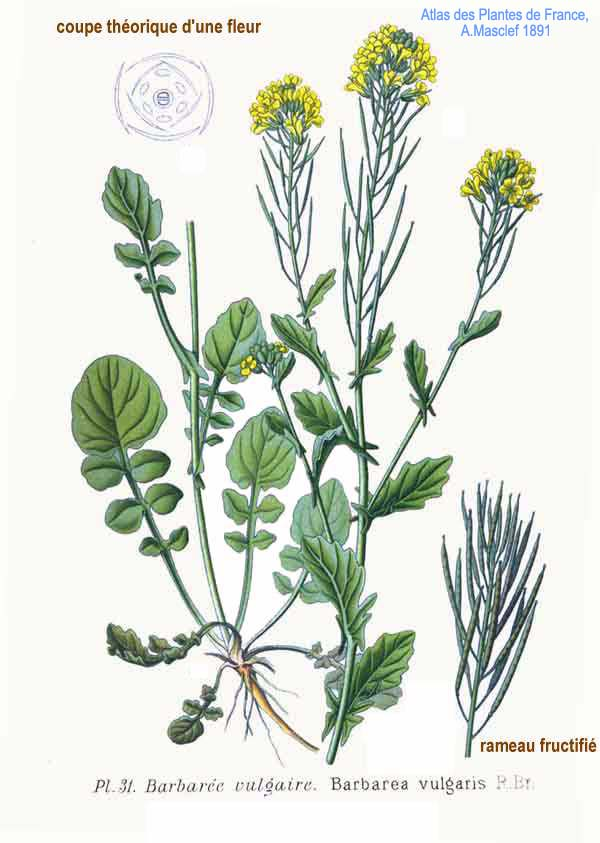
Illustration of B. vulgaris from Atlas des plantes de France. 1891

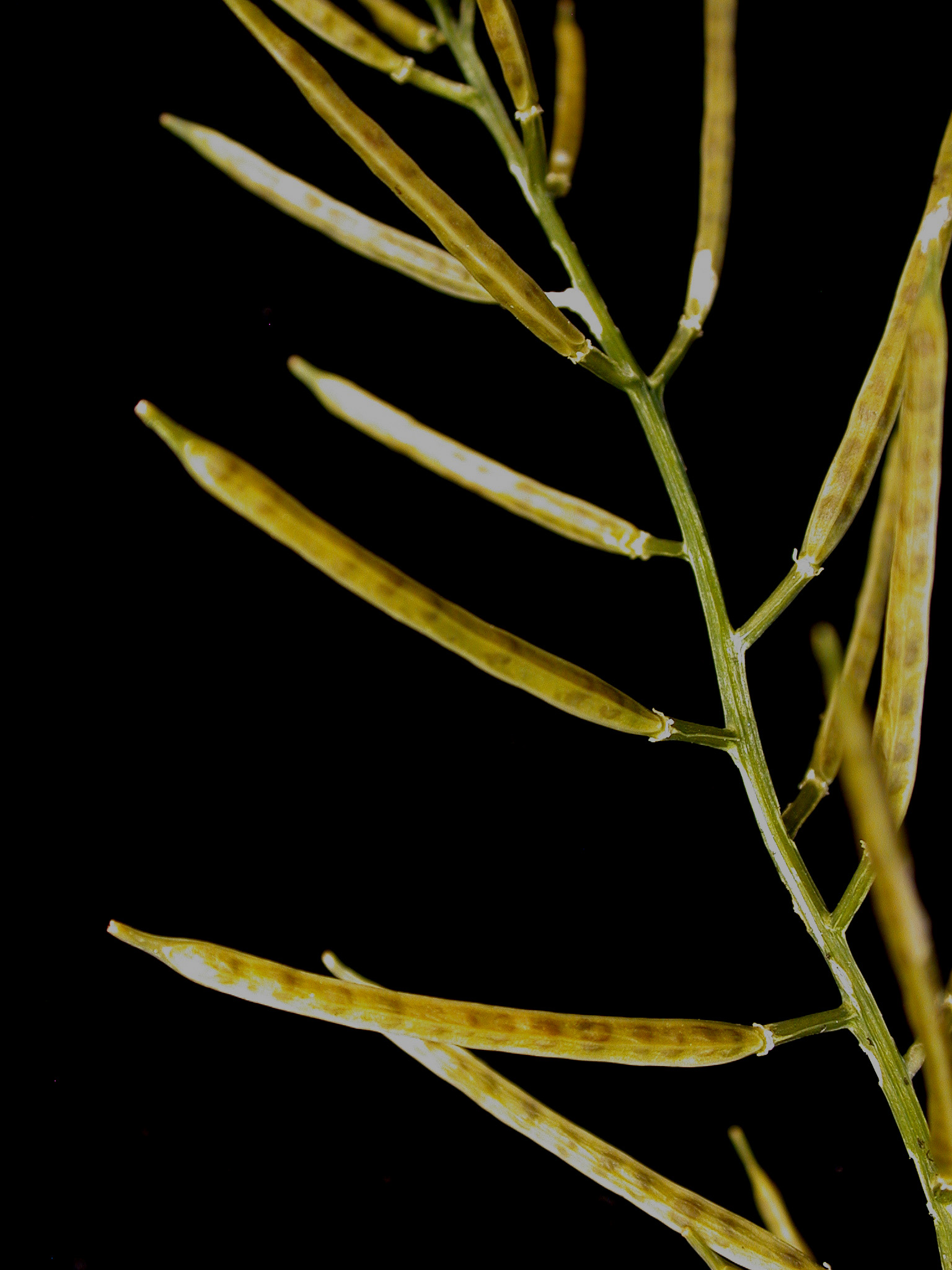
B. vulgaris' maturing siliques (seed capsules)

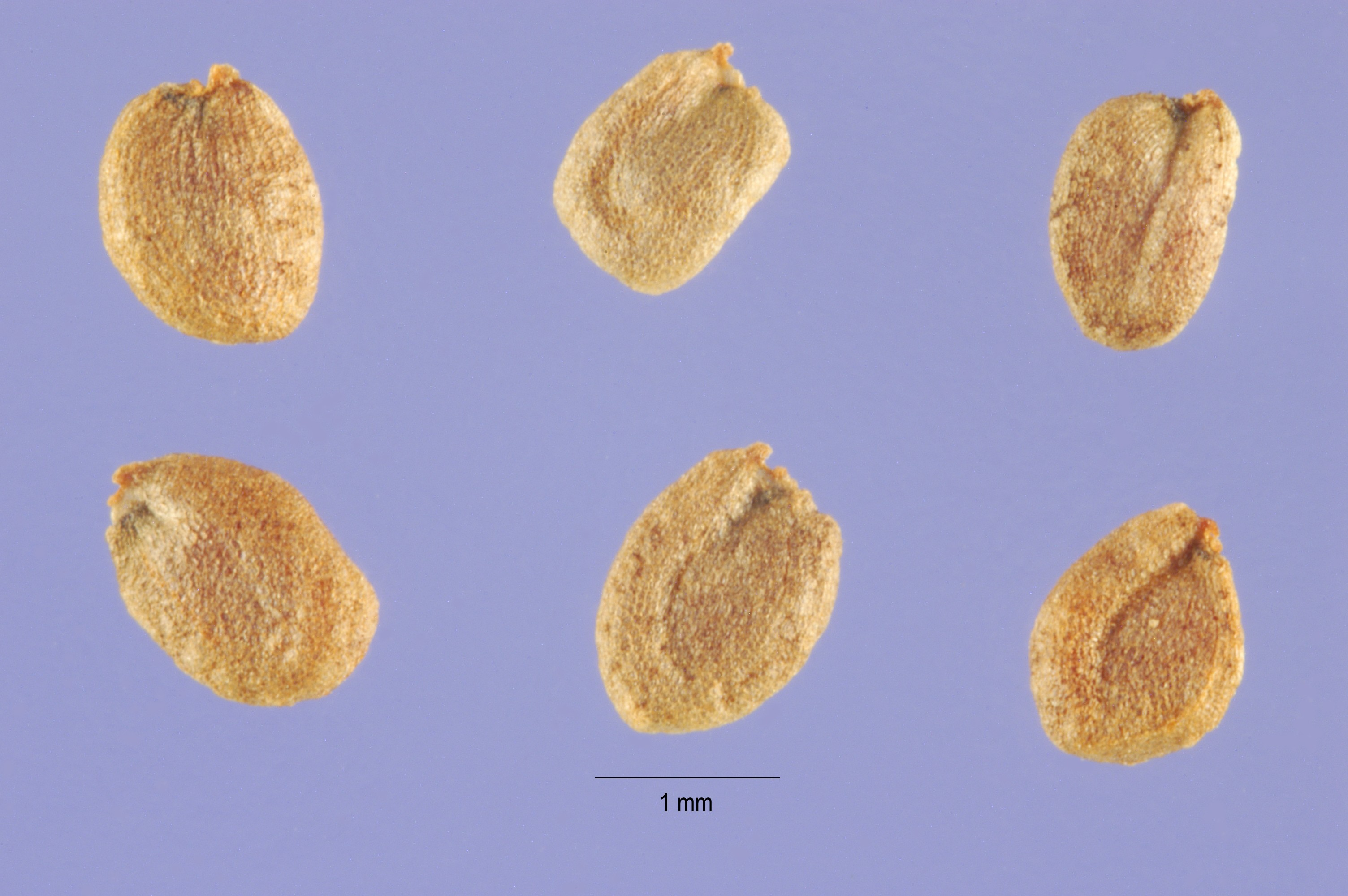
B. vulgaris seeds

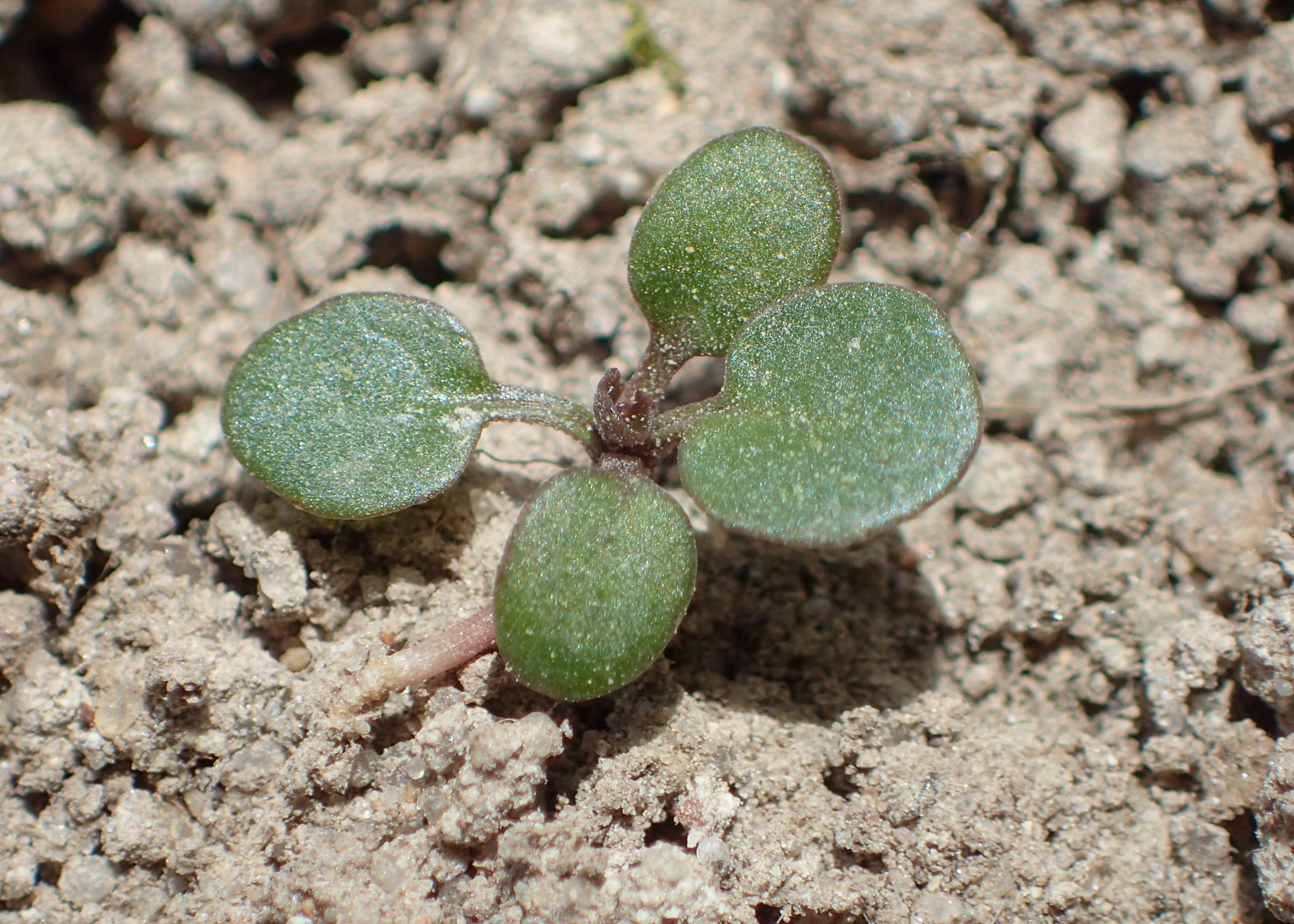
B. vulgaris seedling

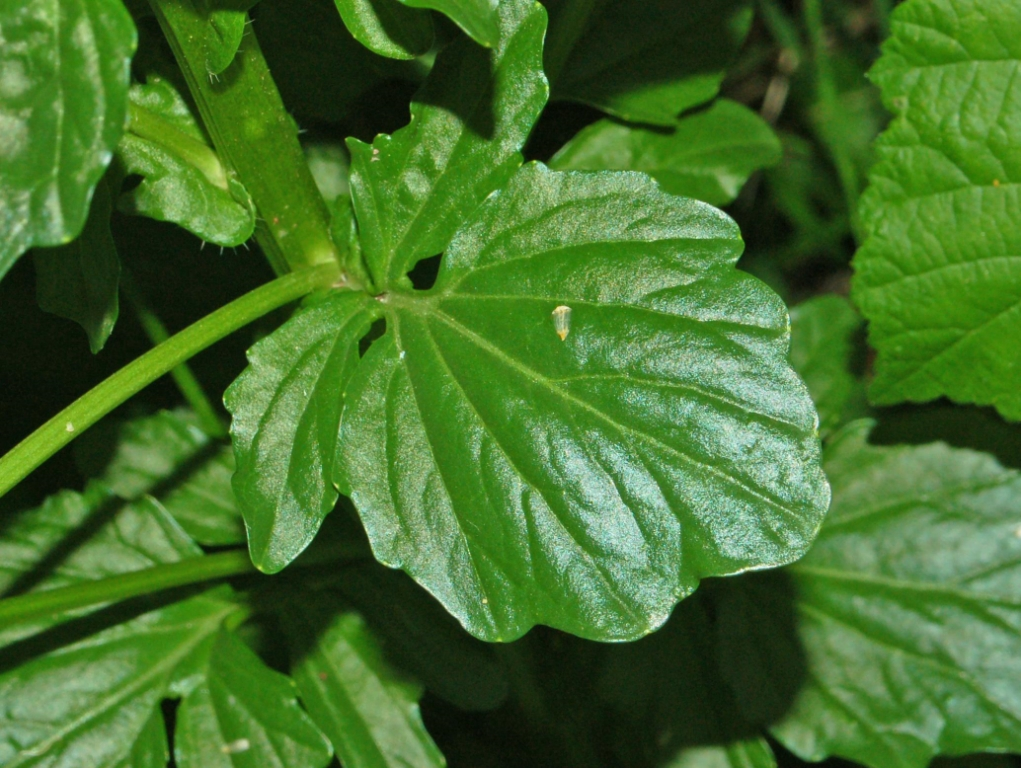
The lyre-pinnatifid leaf of B. vulgaris

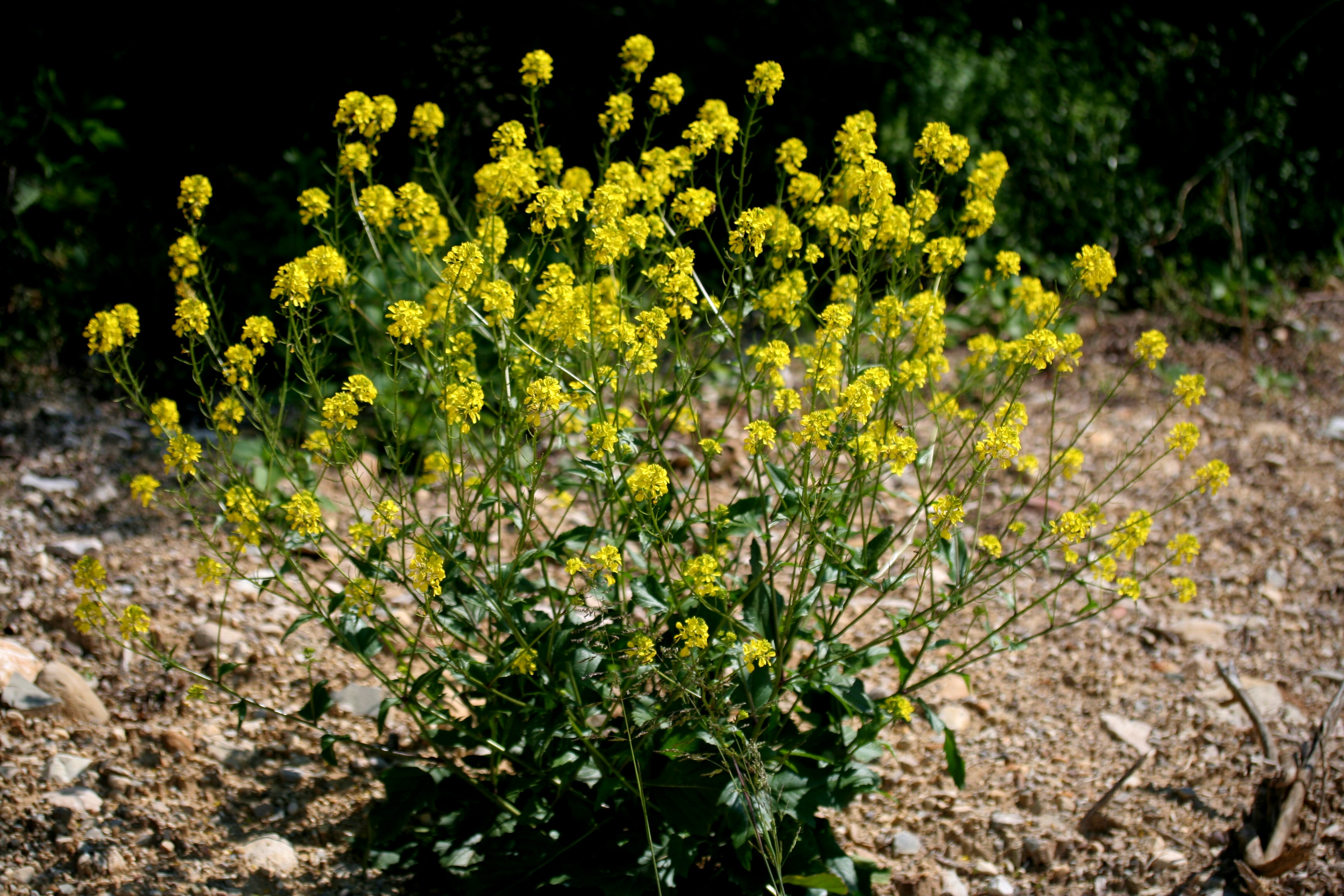
Plant of B. vulgaris

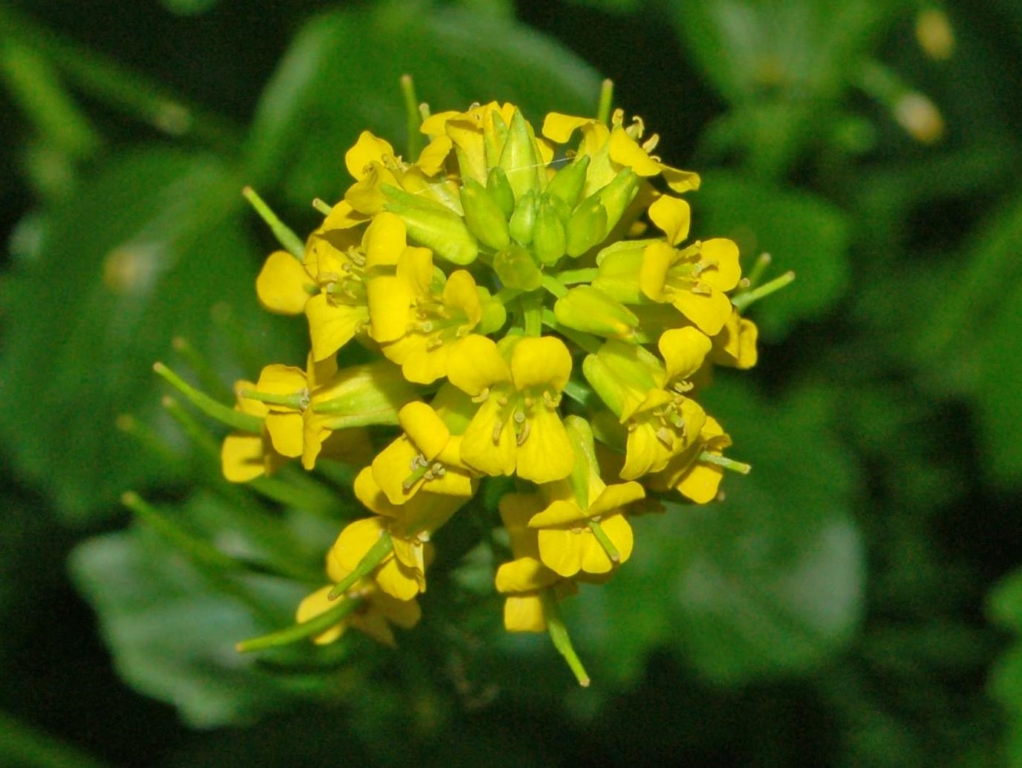
Flowers of B. vulgaris

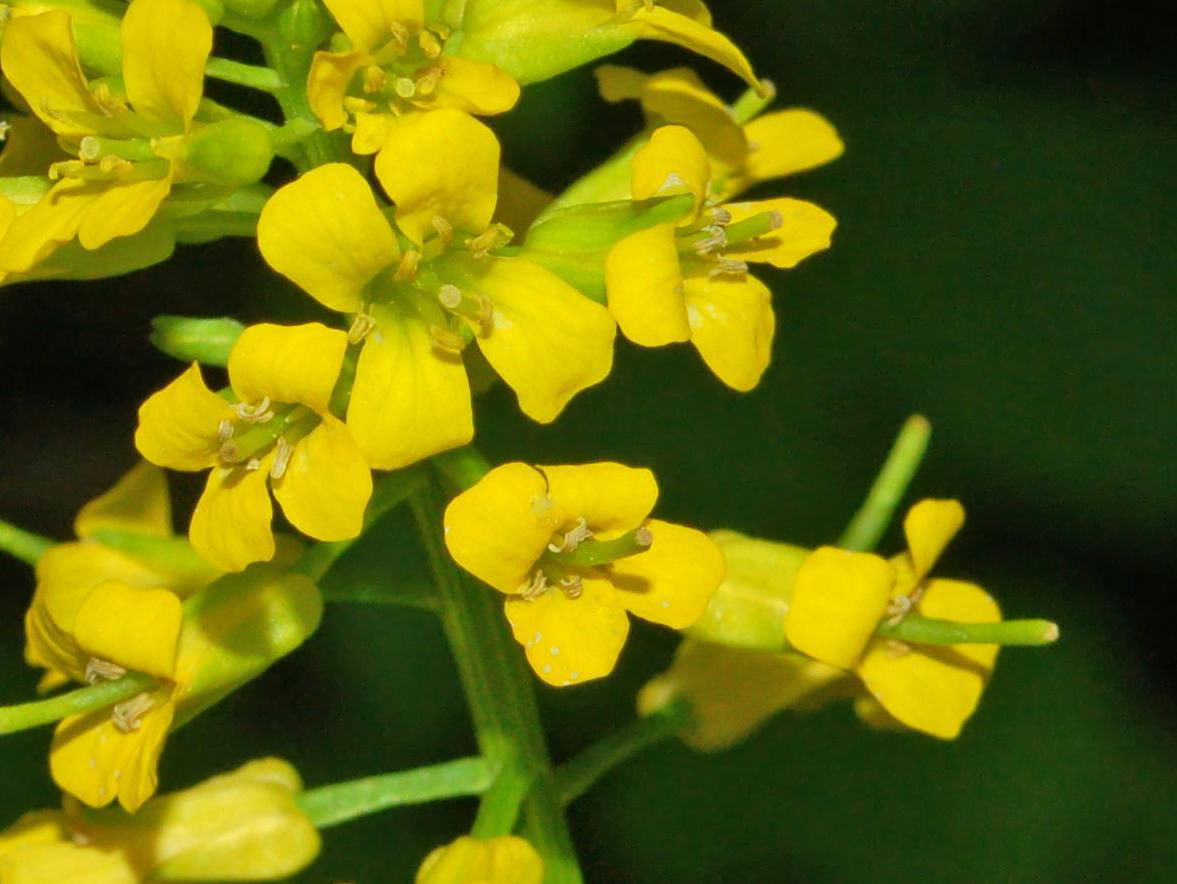
Close-up on flowers of Barbarea vulgaris

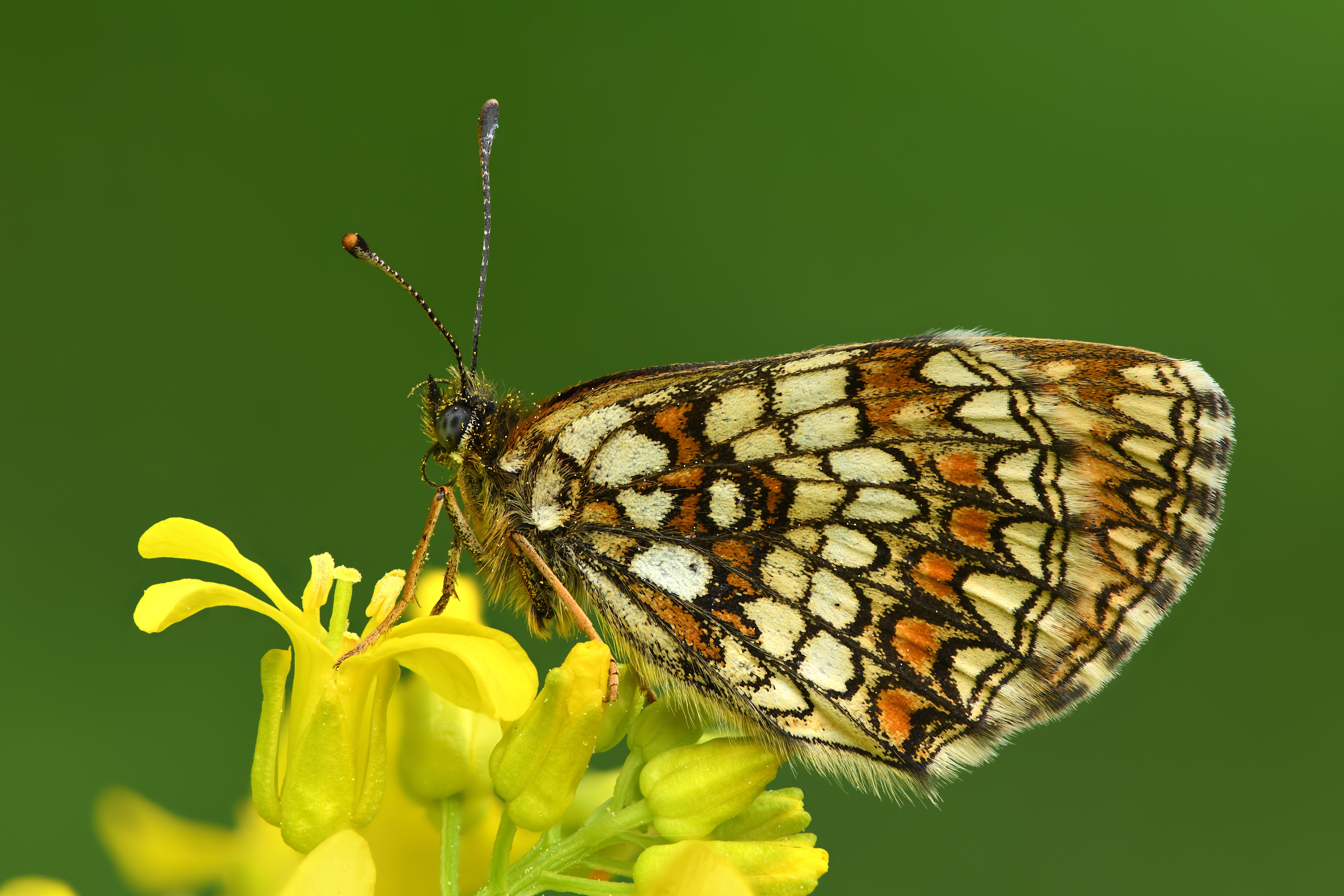
Flowers with a heath fritillary in Keila, Estonia

== See also ==
- Barbarea verna
