= Antoni Andrzejowski =

Polish-Russian botanist, zoologist, educator and writer (1785–1868)

Antoni Lukianowicz Andrzejowski
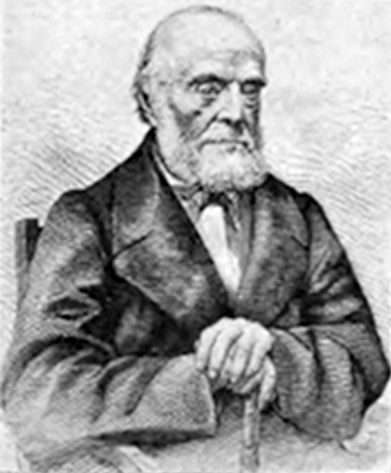
- Antoni Lukianowicz Andrzejowski
- Born: 1784 or 1785; Varkovychi, Polish–Lithuanian Commonwealth
- Died: December 24, 1868; Stavyshche, Russian Empire
- Known for: Taxonomy; Botany
- Scientific career
- Fields: Botany; Zoology; Paleontology
- Academic advisors: Franz Scheidt; Wilibald Swibert Joseph Gottlieb von Besser
- Author abbrev. (botany): Andrz.

Antoni Lukianowicz Andrzejowski (also Anton and Andrzeiovski, Andrzeiowski, Andrzeiowsky, Russian: Антон Лукьянович Андржейовский, Anton Lukjanowitsch Andrschejowski) was a Russian-Polish botanist, zoologist and paleontologist. He also used the pseudonym Stary Detiuk, meaning "old Detiuk". The standard author abbreviation Andrz. is used to indicate this person as the author when citing a botanical name.

== Early life and education ==
Andrzejowski was born the son of a bank clerk and property manager in the village of Varkovychi in the present-day Rivne Oblast in Ukraine. He grew up in various places in western Ukraine and studied in Vilnius after his father's death in 1801. Andrzejowski was a student of the botanists Franz Scheidt and Wilibald Swibert Joseph Gottlieb von Besser in Kremenets.

== Career in botany ==
Andrzejowski was a teacher at the lyceum in Kremenets. After his Polish-language lyceum was dissolved in 1832, he was an assistant to Wilibald Swibert Joseph Gottlieb von Besser and lecturer at Kiev University beginning in 1832. He had to give up that position when the Russian authorities suspected him of harboring conspirators. Beginning in 1839, he taught natural history at the lyceum in Nizhyn. After retiring as a professor, Andrzejowski moved to Stavyshche in 1852, where he led the botanical garden.

His botanical specialties were cruciferous plants (Brassicaceae) and the flora of Ukraine. He was also interested in zoology, geology, and paleontology.

Andrzejowski described 51 fossil species from the Miocene in Volhynia. In 1825 he published a list of Ukrainian wild plants and posthumously in 1869 a flora of Ukraine and its neighboring areas. He collected in Lithuania, Volhynia, Ukraine, and Podolia. Occasionally he also worked on zoology, especially reptiles and amphibians.

The daisy genus Andrzeiowskia is named in his honor. He was a member of the Moscow Society of Naturalists and the Warsaw Natural History Society, as well as correspondent at the University of Kiev.

Species first described by Andrzejowski include small-flowered winter-cress (Barbarea stricta) in the crucifer family (Brassicaceae).

== Publications ==
- Rys botaniczny krain zwiedzanych w podróżach pomiędzy Bohem a Dniestrem od Zbrucza aż do Morza Czarnego odbytych w latach 1814, 1816, 1818, 1822. (1823) (Scientific visits to Bohemia and the Black Sea)
- Nazwiska roślin Grekom starożytnym znanych na język polski przetłumaczone. (Names of ancient plants, in Greek, translated into Polish and English) (with W. Besserem) (1827).
- Ciąg drugi z podróży w 1823 i 1824. (1830) (Continuation of scientific visits to Bohemia and the Black Sea)
- Ramoty Starego Detiuka o Wołyniu. (1859, 1861-1862, 1914, 1921) (Old Detiuka of Volhynia)
- Flora Ukrainy czyli opisanie roślin dziko rosnących w Ukrainie przeddnieprowej i w sąsiednich z nią okolicach Wołynia, Podola i guberni chersońskiej. (1869) (Description of the flora of Ukraine Part 1 [Part 2 not published])
- Nauka wyrazów botanicznych dla łatwości determinowania roślin (1825) (Lists of Ukrainian species)
