= Phyllotreta albionica =

Scientific classification
- Kingdom: Animalia
- Phylum: Arthropoda
- Clade: Pancrustacea
- Class: Insecta
- Order: Coleoptera
- Suborder: Polyphaga
- Infraorder: Cucujiformia
- Family: Chrysomelidae
- Tribe: Alticini
- Genus: Phyllotreta
- Species: P. albionica

Binomial name
- Phyllotreta albionica (J. L. LeConte, 1857)

Species of beetle

Phyllotreta albionica, the cabbage flea beetle, is a species of flea beetle in the family Chrysomelidae. It is found in Central America and North America.

== Subspecies ==
These two subspecies belong to the species Phyllotreta albionica:

- Phyllotreta albionica albionica
- Phyllotreta albionica corusca Chittenden
