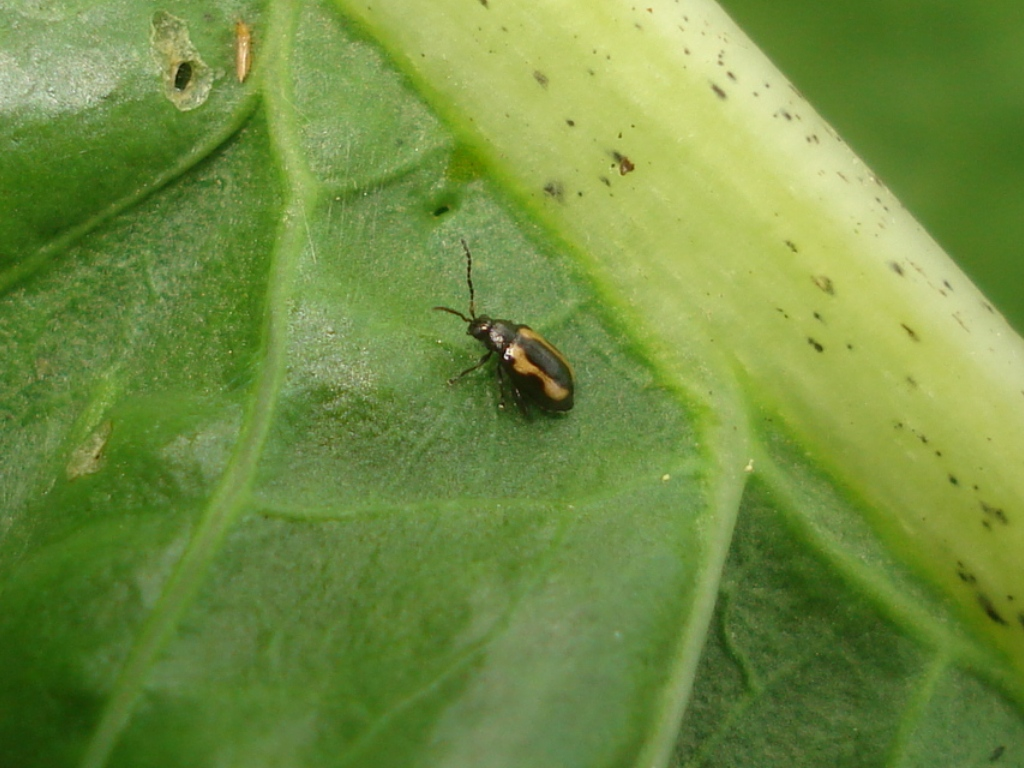

Scientific classification
- Kingdom: Animalia
- Phylum: Arthropoda
- Clade: Pancrustacea
- Class: Insecta
- Order: Coleoptera
- Suborder: Polyphaga
- Infraorder: Cucujiformia
- Family: Chrysomelidae
- Genus: Phyllotreta
- Species: P. striolata

Binomial name
- Phyllotreta striolata (Fabricius, 1801)

Synonyms
- Haltica striolata Fabricius, 1801; Haltica bipustulata Fabricius, 1801

= Striped flea beetle =

Species of beetle

The striped flea beetle (Phyllotreta striolata) is a small flea beetle, shiny black with a greenish tinge, 1.5 to 2.5 mm long, having a wavy amber line running the length of each elytron (wing cover). It is a pest of cabbage and other brassicas. The hind legs are thickened, enabling the beetle to jump like a flea when disturbed.

The minute, oval to elongate white eggs are laid in the soil close to the host plant. The white, brown-headed larva, when fully grown, is 3.2 to 5.0 mm long. It has three pairs of tiny legs near its head. The white pupa is approximately the same size and shape as the adult.

Eurasian in origin, the striped flea beetle is common throughout the eastern and Pacific areas of the United States (though not in much of the Rocky Mountain region), as well as in South Africa.

Although the larvae live in the soil, feeding on the roots of host plants, they are not significant pests. Rather, the primary damage is caused by adult beetles feeding on the foliage. With their chewing mouthparts, beetles make small round pits in the cotyledons and leaves of young plants. As the plants grow, the remaining thin layers of tissue eventually dry up and fall away, leaving small "shot holes" in the foliage. This type of injury is capable of killing young plants. The seedlings may be killed if severe damage occurs. In addition, beetles may act as vectors of plant disease.

Striped flea beetles overwinter among debris in and around fields. Emerging early in spring, they attack seedlings and young plants. Eggs are deposited in tiny crevices gnawed out of the base of host plant stems. About ten days later, the grubs hatch from the eggs and move into the soil to attack roots. After feeding for three or four weeks, the larvae pupate for seven to ten days. A new generation of beetles then emerges. Generations can be continual in warmer climates, recurring at least twice a year.

Cultivation practices and the use of resistant crop varieties help prevent severe flea beetle infestations. Seedbeds are covered with strips of a thin transparent gauze to protect seedlings from adult feeding before transplanting. Good weed control and the destruction of crop residue in and around fields reduce overwintering populations. After harvest, fields are plowed to expose larvae. For quick control of large populations attacking young seedlings, insecticide sprays are the only alternatives.

Biological pest control can be introduced to fight the beetle. Many other insect species act as parasitoids, attacking the pest beetle. These parasitoids include the braconid wasps Microtonus epitricis, M. punctulatae, M. vittatae and Townesilitus psylliodis. Among biological insecticides, the nematode species Steinernema feltiae and S. carpocapsae show promise.

The use of resistant plant varieties may reduce injury by existing beetles. Resistant cabbage varieties include 'Stein's Early Flat Dutch', 'Mammoth Red Rock', 'Savoy Perfection Drumhead', and 'Ferry's Round Dutch'. 'Vates and Georgia' is a resistant collard variety. 'Florida Broadleaf' is a resistant mustard plant, and 'American Purple Top' is a resistant rutabaga. Resistant cauliflower varieties include 'Snowball A' and 'Early Snowball X'. Varieties of broccoli resistant to the beetle include 'DeCicco', 'Coastal', 'Italian Green Sprouting' and 'Atlantic' and resistant kale varieties include 'Dwarf Siberian', 'Dwarf Green Curled Scotch', and 'Early Siberian'.
