= Phyllotreta ramosa =

Scientific classification
- Kingdom: Animalia
- Phylum: Arthropoda
- Class: Insecta
- Order: Coleoptera
- Suborder: Polyphaga
- Infraorder: Cucujiformia
- Family: Chrysomelidae
- Tribe: Alticini
- Genus: Phyllotreta
- Species: P. ramosa

Binomial name
- Phyllotreta ramosa (Crotch, 1874)

Species of beetle

Phyllotreta ramosa, the western striped flea beetle, is a species of flea beetle in the family Chrysomelidae. It is found in North America.
