= Phyllotreta zimmermanni =

Scientific classification
- Kingdom: Animalia
- Phylum: Arthropoda
- Class: Insecta
- Order: Coleoptera
- Suborder: Polyphaga
- Infraorder: Cucujiformia
- Family: Chrysomelidae
- Genus: Phyllotreta
- Species: P. zimmermanni

Binomial name
- Phyllotreta zimmermanni (Crotch, 1873)

Species of beetle

Phyllotreta zimmermanni, or Zimmerman's flea beetle, is a species of flea beetle in the family Chrysomelidae. It is holarctic, found in North America where it is considered invasive.
