= Phyllotreta liebecki =

Scientific classification
- Kingdom: Animalia
- Phylum: Arthropoda
- Class: Insecta
- Order: Coleoptera
- Suborder: Polyphaga
- Infraorder: Cucujiformia
- Family: Chrysomelidae
- Tribe: Alticini
- Genus: Phyllotreta
- Species: P. liebecki

Binomial name
- Phyllotreta liebecki Schaeffer, 1919

Species of beetle

Phyllotreta liebecki is a species of flea beetle in the family Chrysomelidae. It is found in North America.

== Classification ==
- Kingdom Animalia: (Animals)
- Phylum Arthropoda: (Arthropods)
- Subphylum Hexapoda: (Hexapods)
- Class Insecta: (Insects)
- Order Coleoptera: (Beetles)
- Suborder Polyphaga: (Water, Rove, Scarab, Long-horned, Leaf and Snout Beetles)
- No Taxon: (Series Cucujiformia)
- Superfamily Chrysomeloidea: (Longhorn and Leaf Beetles)
- Family Chrysomelidae: (Leaf Beetles)
- Subfamily Galerucinae: (Skeletonizing Leaf Beetles and Flea Beetles)
- Tribe Alticini: (Flea Beetles)
- Genus: Phyllotreta
- Species liebecki: (Phyllotreta liebecki)

== Size ==
1.75-2.5 mm (Schaeffer 1919)

== Identification ==
Elongate oval. Shining black with sinuate yellow vitta on each elytron, vittae broadly attaining margni at apex. Head, pronotum, and elytra closely punctate.

First 4 antennal segments of liebecki light brown, 5-11 dark brown; male with 5th antennal segment stouter than striolata but less stout than in P. zimmermanni.

Elytral pattern shared with P. robusta; in males, the shape and length of antennal segment 5 is different: only slightly shorter than 2-4, dilated apically, but not with internal process like in P. robusta.
