= Barbarea balcana =

Conservation status
- Least Concern (IUCN 3.1)

Scientific classification
- Kingdom: Plantae
- Clade: Tracheophytes
- Clade: Angiosperms
- Clade: Eudicots
- Clade: Rosids
- Order: Brassicales
- Family: Brassicaceae
- Genus: Barbarea
- Species: B. balcana

Binomial name
- Barbarea balcana Pančić

Species of flowering plant

Barbarea balcana, also known as the Balkan yellow rocket, is a perennial herb of the genus Barbarea from the family Brassicaceae that grows in wet spring areas.
