= Phyllotreta chalybeipennis =

Scientific classification
- Kingdom: Animalia
- Phylum: Arthropoda
- Class: Insecta
- Order: Coleoptera
- Suborder: Polyphaga
- Infraorder: Cucujiformia
- Family: Chrysomelidae
- Tribe: Alticini
- Genus: Phyllotreta
- Species: P. chalybeipennis

Binomial name
- Phyllotreta chalybeipennis (Crotch, 1873)

Species of beetle

Phyllotreta chalybeipennis is a species of flea beetle in the family Chrysomelidae. It is found in the Caribbean Sea and North America. Larvae are leaf miners of Cakile edentula, and adults feed on leaves of the same host.
