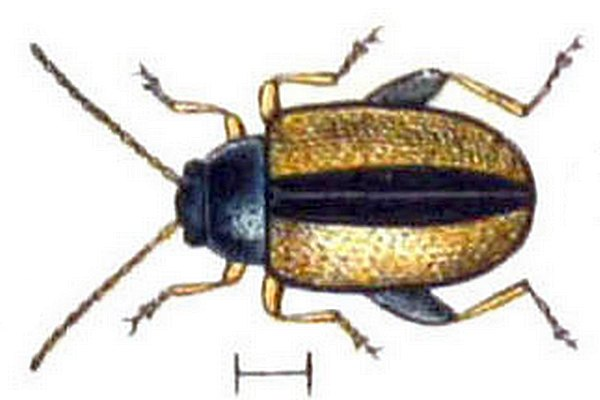

Scientific classification
- Kingdom: Animalia
- Phylum: Arthropoda
- Clade: Pancrustacea
- Class: Insecta
- Order: Coleoptera
- Suborder: Polyphaga
- Infraorder: Cucujiformia
- Family: Chrysomelidae
- Tribe: Alticini
- Genus: Phyllotreta
- Species: P. armoraciae

Binomial name
- Phyllotreta armoraciae (Koch, 1803)

= Phyllotreta armoraciae =

Species of beetle

Phyllotreta armoraciae, the horseradish flea beetle, is a species of flea beetle in the family Chrysomelidae. It is found in North America and Europe.

== Subspecies ==
These two subspecies belong to the species Phyllotreta armoraciae:

- Phyllotreta armoraciae armoraciae
- Phyllotreta armoraciae biplagiata Chittenden
