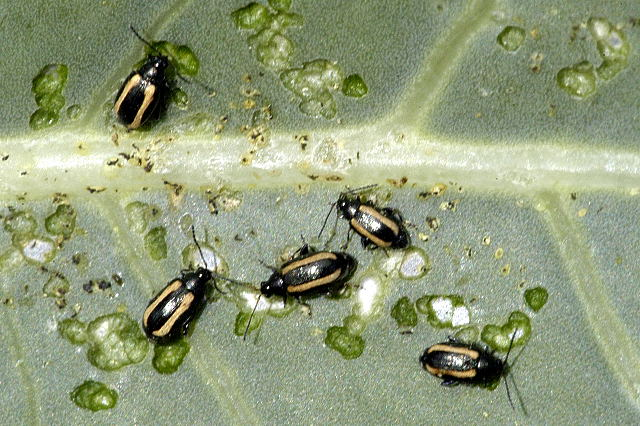

Scientific classification
- Kingdom: Animalia
- Phylum: Arthropoda
- Clade: Pancrustacea
- Class: Insecta
- Order: Coleoptera
- Suborder: Polyphaga
- Infraorder: Cucujiformia
- Family: Chrysomelidae
- Genus: Phyllotreta
- Species: P. vittula

Binomial name
- Phyllotreta vittula (L. Redtenbacher, 1849)

Synonyms
- Haltica vittula Redtenbacher, 1849; Phyllotreta sinuata (Stephens, 1831)

= Phyllotreta vittula =

Species of flea beetle

Phyllotreta vittula, commonly known as the barley flea beetle, is a species of flea beetle in the Chrysomelidae family that can be found across the Palearctic including North Africa and has been introduced into the United States. It is found on the margins of arable fields and roadside verges. This species of flea beetle is between 1.5-2.1mm and is black with yellow stripes on the elytra.
