= Phyllotreta pusilla =

Scientific classification
- Kingdom: Animalia
- Phylum: Arthropoda
- Class: Insecta
- Order: Coleoptera
- Suborder: Polyphaga
- Infraorder: Cucujiformia
- Family: Chrysomelidae
- Tribe: Alticini
- Genus: Phyllotreta
- Species: P. pusilla

Binomial name
- Phyllotreta pusilla Horn, 1889

Species of beetle

Phyllotreta pusilla, the western black flea beetle, is a species of flea beetle in the family Chrysomelidae. It is found in Central America and North America.
