= Phyllotreta lewisii =

Scientific classification
- Kingdom: Animalia
- Phylum: Arthropoda
- Class: Insecta
- Order: Coleoptera
- Suborder: Polyphaga
- Infraorder: Cucujiformia
- Family: Chrysomelidae
- Tribe: Alticini
- Genus: Phyllotreta
- Species: P. lewisii

Binomial name
- Phyllotreta lewisii (Crotch, 1873)

Species of beetle

Phyllotreta lewisii is a species of flea beetle in the family Chrysomelidae.
