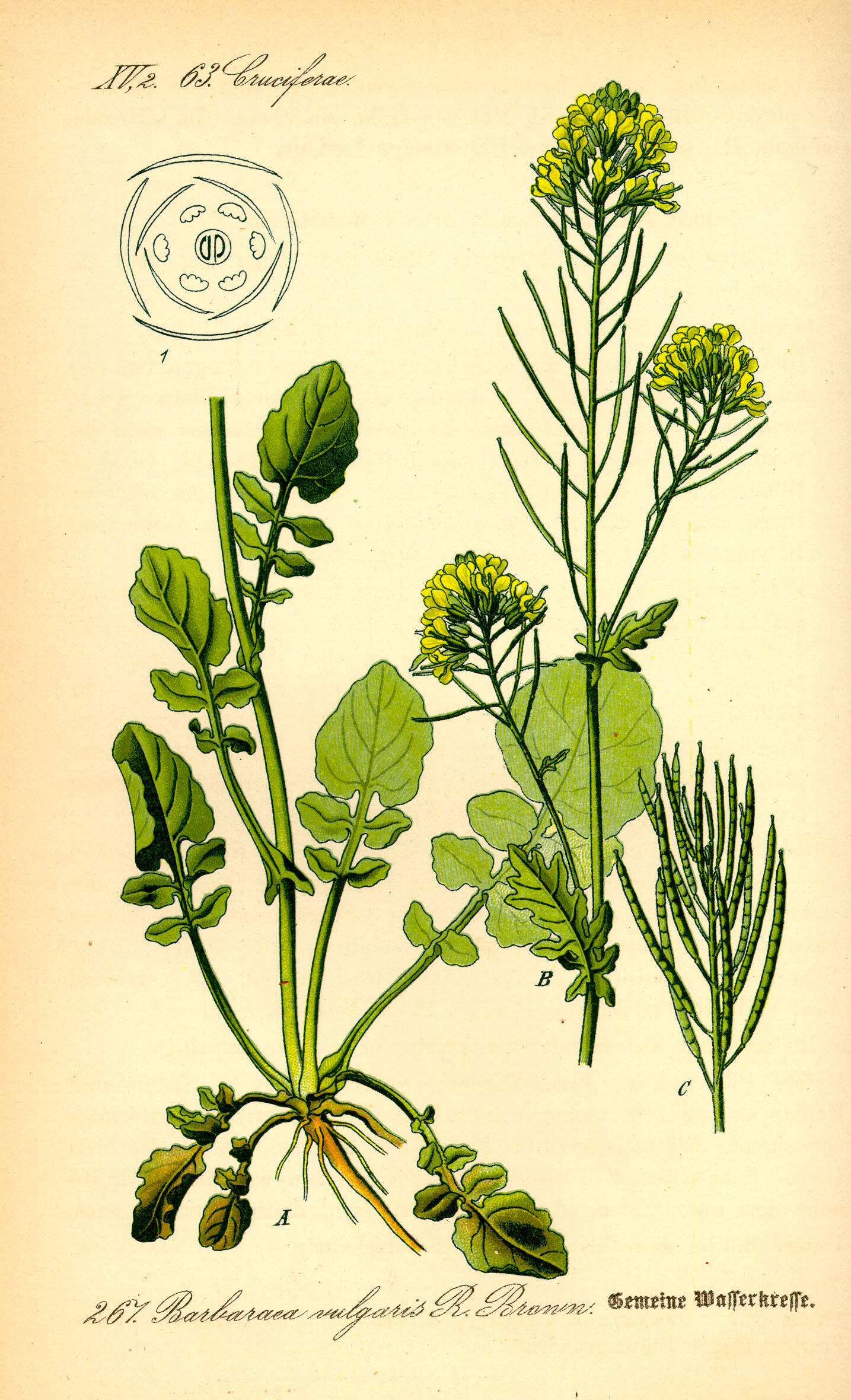
- Barbarea vulgaris

Scientific classification
- Kingdom: Plantae
- Clade: Tracheophytes
- Clade: Angiosperms
- Clade: Eudicots
- Clade: Rosids
- Order: Brassicales
- Family: Brassicaceae
- Genus: Barbarea; W. T. Aiton

Synonyms
- Campe Dulac; Ceriosperma (O.E.Schulz) Greuter & Burdet

= Barbarea =

Genus of flowering plants

Barbarea (winter cress or yellow rocket) is a genus of about 29 species of flowering plants in the family Brassicaceae. Most are native to temperate regions of the Northern Hemisphere, with the highest species diversity in southern Europe and southwest Asia. They are small, herbaceous, biennial or perennial plants with dark green, deeply lobed leaves and yellow flowers with four petals.

== Species ==
29 species and three natural interspecies hybrids are accepted.

- Barbarea × abortiva Hausskn.
- Barbarea anfractuosa (Hartvig & Å.Strid) Bağcı & Savran
- Barbarea arcuata (Opiz ex J.Presl & C.Presl) Rchb.
- Barbarea auriculata Hausskn. ex Bornm.
- Barbarea australis Hook.f.
- Barbarea balcana Pančić
- Barbarea bosniaca Murb.
- Barbarea bracteosa Guss.
- Barbarea duralii Bağcı & Savran
- Barbarea × gradlii Murr
- Barbarea grandiflora N.Busch
- Barbarea grayi Hewson
- Barbarea hongii Al-Shehbaz & G.Yang
- Barbarea integrifolia DC.
- Barbarea intermedia Boreau
- Barbarea × krausei P.Fourn.
- Barbarea lepuznica Nyár.
- Barbarea longirostris Velen.
- Barbarea lutea Coode & Cullen
- Barbarea macrocarpa (Boiss. & Heldr.) Al-Shehbaz & Jacquemoud
- Barbarea oligosperma K.Koch
- Barbarea orthoceras Ledeb.
- Barbarea plantaginea DC.
- Barbarea platycarpa Hausskn. ex Bornm.
- Barbarea rupicola Moris
- Barbarea × schulzeana Hausskn.
- Barbarea sicula C.Presl
- Barbarea stricta Andrz. ex Besser
- Barbarea taiwaniana Ohwi
- Barbarea trichopoda Hausskn. ex Bornm.
- Barbarea verna (Mill.) Asch.
- Barbarea vulgaris W.T.Aiton

== Uses ==
They grow into rosettes of edible cress foliage that resemble dandelion leaves. Barbarea verna, known as upland cress, early winter cress, American cress, Belle Isle cress and scurvy grass, is used to add a spicy taste to salads and mixed leaf greens for cooking.

== Chemical compounds ==
Winter cress contains different glucosinolates, flavonoids, and saponins.

== See also ==
- Rocket (arugula)
