= Phyllotreta aeneicollis =

Scientific classification
- Kingdom: Animalia
- Phylum: Arthropoda
- Class: Insecta
- Order: Coleoptera
- Suborder: Polyphaga
- Infraorder: Cucujiformia
- Family: Chrysomelidae
- Genus: Phyllotreta
- Species: P. aeneicollis

Binomial name
- Phyllotreta aeneicollis (Crotch, 1873)

Species of beetle

Phyllotreta aeneicollis is a species of flea beetles in the family Chrysomelidae. It is found in North America.
