= Phyllotreta robusta =

Scientific classification
- Kingdom: Animalia
- Phylum: Arthropoda
- Clade: Pancrustacea
- Class: Insecta
- Order: Coleoptera
- Suborder: Polyphaga
- Infraorder: Cucujiformia
- Family: Chrysomelidae
- Tribe: Alticini
- Genus: Phyllotreta
- Species: P. robusta

Binomial name
- Phyllotreta robusta J. L. LeConte, 1878

Species of beetle

Phyllotreta robusta, the garden flea beetle, is a species of flea beetle in the family Chrysomelidae. It is found in North America.
