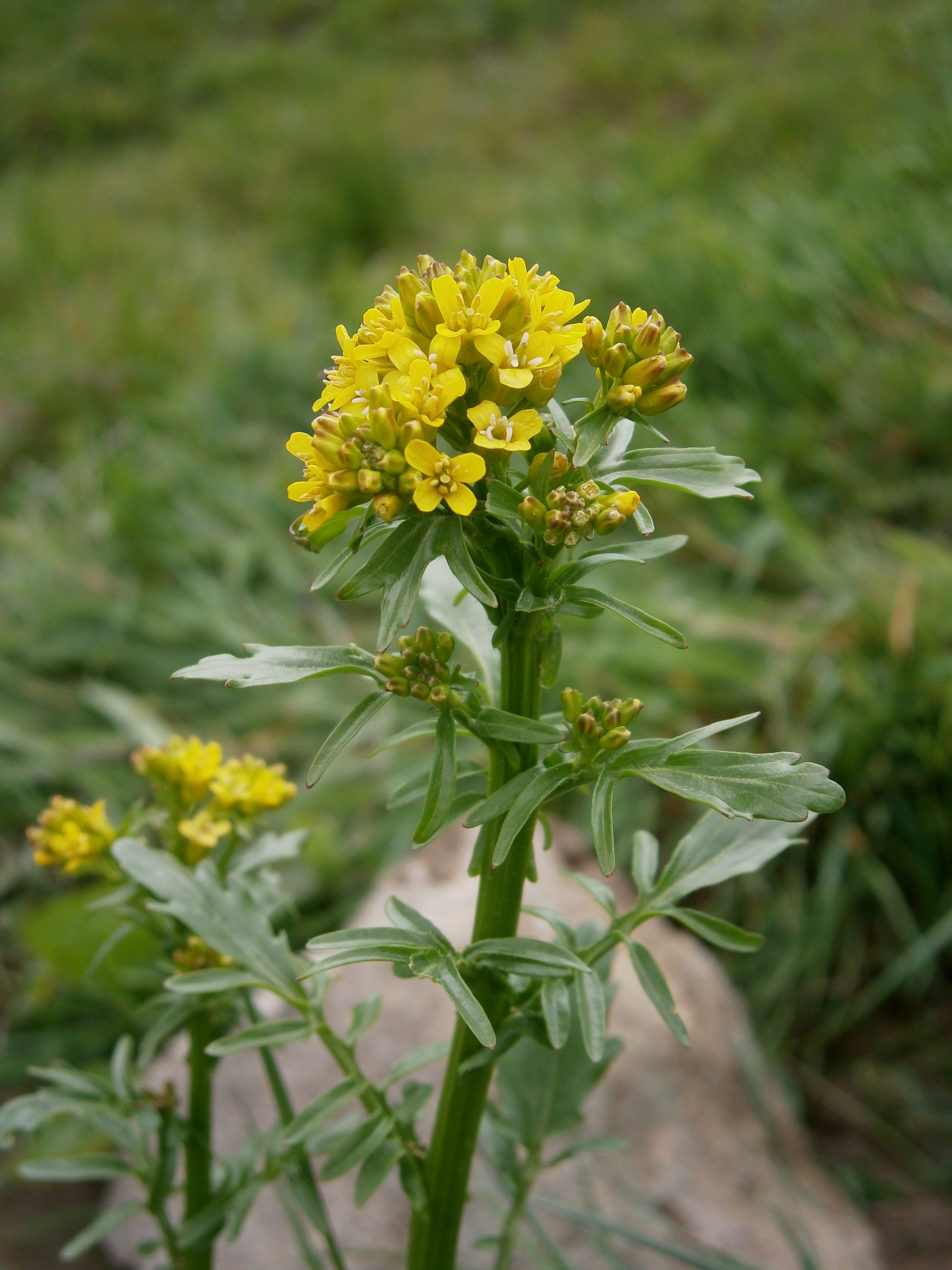

Scientific classification
- Kingdom: Plantae
- Clade: Tracheophytes
- Clade: Angiosperms
- Clade: Eudicots
- Clade: Rosids
- Order: Brassicales
- Family: Brassicaceae
- Genus: Barbarea
- Species: B. intermedia

Binomial name
- Barbarea intermedia Boreau

= Barbarea intermedia =

Species of flowering plant

Barbarea intermedia (common name medium-flowered winter-cress) is a species of flowering plant in the family Brassicaceae. It is native to northern Africa and many parts of Europe, and naturalized in some parts of Asia, Africa and Europe.
