= Andrzeiowskia =

Scientific classification
- Kingdom: Plantae
- Clade: Tracheophytes
- Clade: Angiosperms
- Clade: Eudicots
- Clade: Rosids
- Order: Brassicales
- Family: Brassicaceae
- Genus: Andrzeiowskia; Rchb.
- Species: A. cardamine

Binomial name
- Andrzeiowskia cardamine Rchb.

Synonyms
- Andreoskia Spach; Macroceratium (DC.) Rchb.; Andreoskia cardamine (Rchb.) Boiss.; Lepidium cornutum d'Urv.; Macroceratium cornutum Rchb.

Genus of flowering plants

Andrzeiowskia is a genus of flowering plants belonging to the family Brassicaceae. It includes a single species, Andrzeiowskia cardamine, an annual native to Bulgaria, European and Asiatic Turkey, Cyprus, Lebanon, Syria, and the northern Caucasus.
