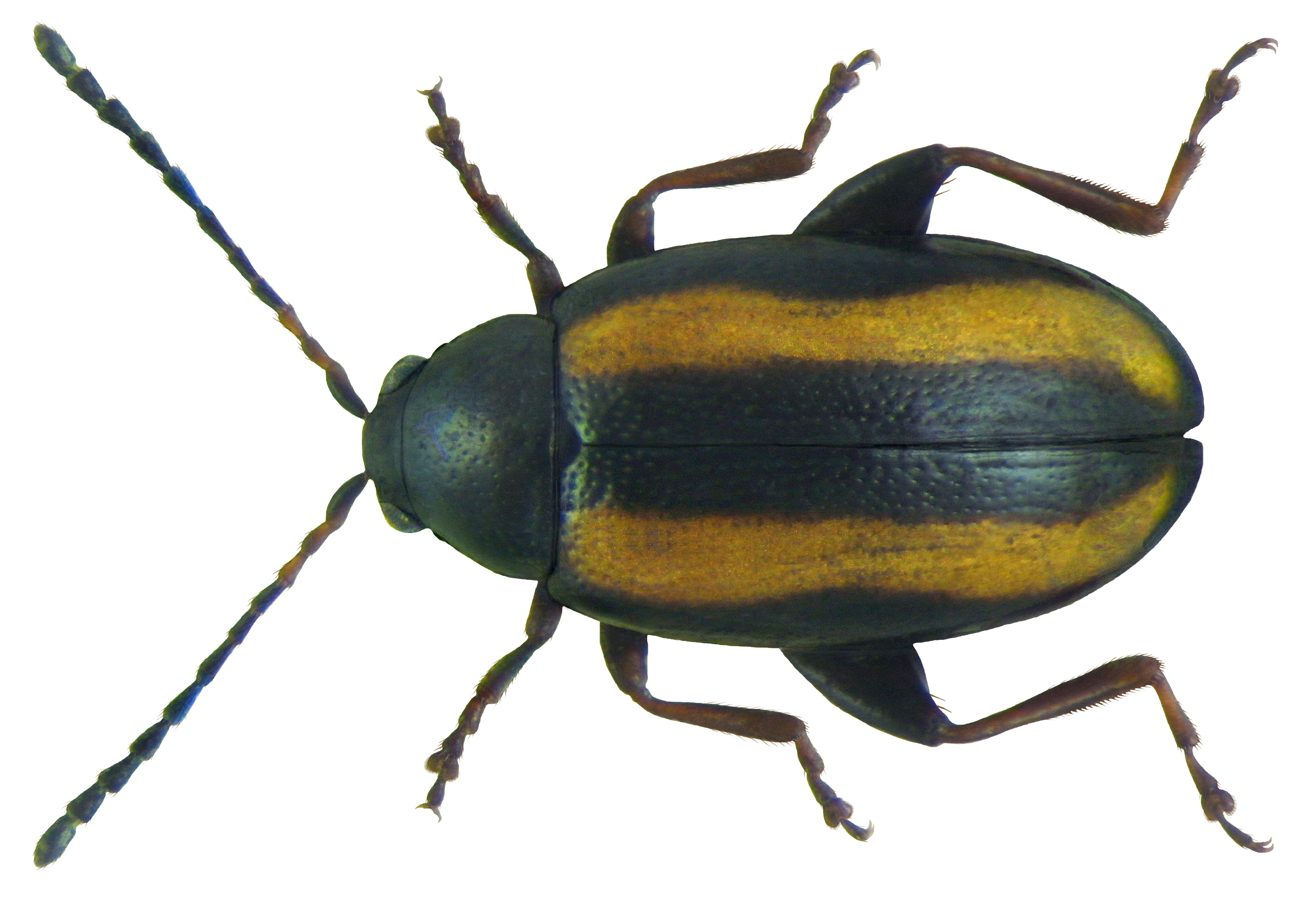

Scientific classification
- Kingdom: Animalia
- Phylum: Arthropoda
- Class: Insecta
- Order: Coleoptera
- Suborder: Polyphaga
- Infraorder: Cucujiformia
- Family: Chrysomelidae
- Genus: Phyllotreta
- Species: P. nemorum

Binomial name
- Phyllotreta nemorum (Linnaeus, 1758)

= Phyllotreta nemorum =

Species of beetle

Phyllotreta nemorum, the turnip flea beetle or yellow-striped flea beetle is a species of beetle in family Chrysomelidae. The beetle is 2.4-3.5 mm long and black with sinuate yellow bands running down its elytra. It is found in the Palearctic.

The beetle feeds on various wild and cultivated Brassicaceae, and also on mignonettes (Reseda spp.) and brooklime (Veronica beccabunga). Adults consume leaves while larvae are leaf-miners. They are themselves preyed on by swifts (Apus apus) and parasitised by braconid and eulophid wasps.
