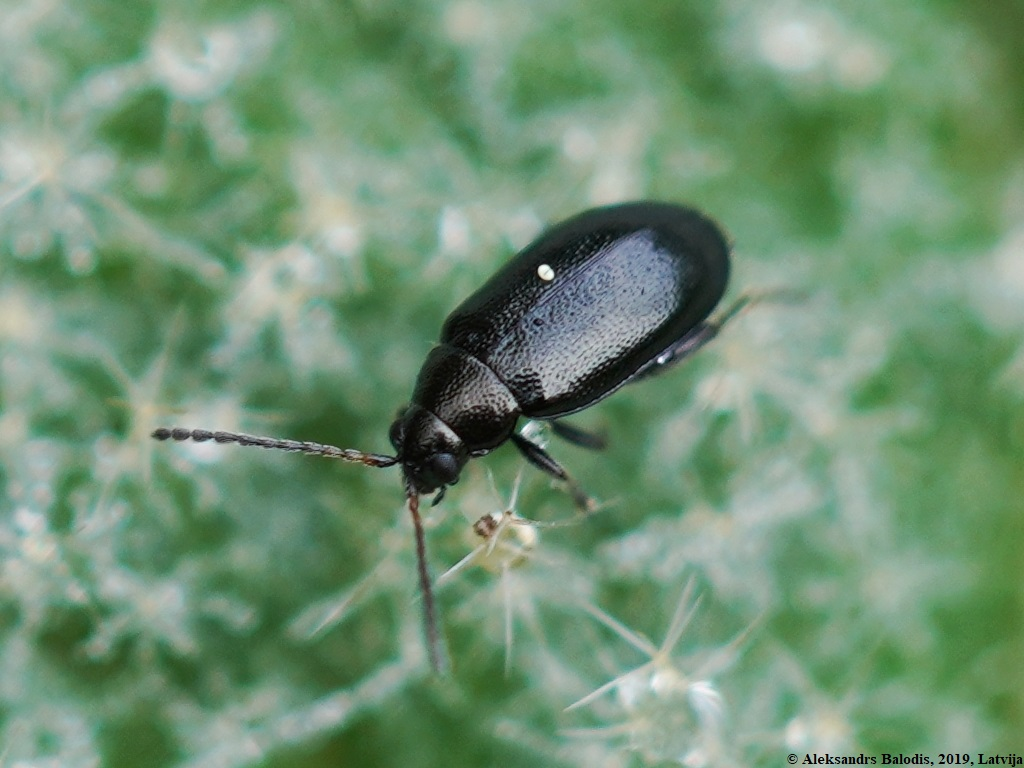

Scientific classification
- Kingdom: Animalia
- Phylum: Arthropoda
- Clade: Pancrustacea
- Class: Insecta
- Order: Coleoptera
- Suborder: Polyphaga
- Infraorder: Cucujiformia
- Family: Chrysomelidae
- Tribe: Alticini
- Genus: Phyllotreta
- Species: P. cruciferae

Binomial name
- Phyllotreta cruciferae (Goeze, 1777)

= Phyllotreta cruciferae =

Species of beetle

Phyllotreta cruciferae, known generally as crucifer flea beetle, is a species of flea beetle in the family Chrysomelidae. Other common names include the canola flea beetle and rape flea beetle. It is found in Europe and Northern Asia (excluding China) and North America.
