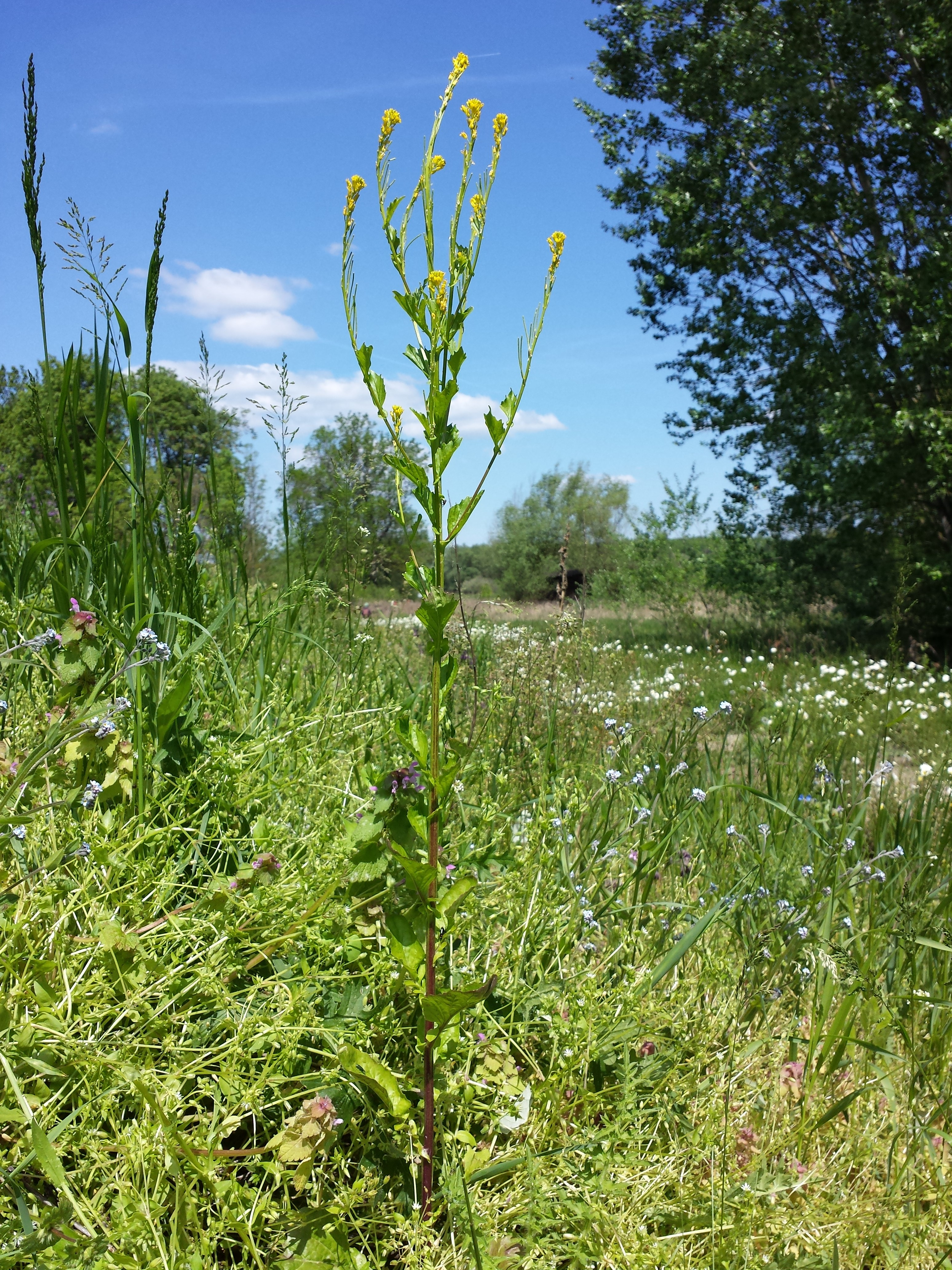

Scientific classification
- Kingdom: Plantae
- Clade: Tracheophytes
- Clade: Angiosperms
- Clade: Eudicots
- Clade: Rosids
- Order: Brassicales
- Family: Brassicaceae
- Genus: Barbarea
- Species: B. stricta

Binomial name
- Barbarea stricta Andrz. ex Besser

Synonyms
- Barbarea barbarea var. stricta (Andrz.) MacMill.; Barbarea palustris Hegetschw.; Barbarea parviflora Fr.; Barbarea vulgaris var. stricta (Andrz. ex Besser) A.Gray; Barbarea vulgaris var. stricta (Andrz.) Regel; Campe stricta (Andrz.) W.Wight; Campe stricta var. taurica (DC.) House; Crucifera stricta E.H.L.Krause

= Barbarea stricta =

Small-flowered winter-cress

Species of plant

Barbarea stricta, the small-flowered winter-cress, is a species of plant in the family Brassicaceae.

== Description ==
Barbarea stricta is a biennial or perennial herb up to 100 cm tall. Leaves are up to 7 cm long, pinnately lobed with 1–3 pairs of lobes. Flowers are yellow, up to 10 mm across. Fruits are cylindrical or sometimes square in cross section.

== Distribution ==
first described in 1822 from Podolia, what is now the western part of Ukraine. It is native to Europe and Asia but widely naturalized in parts of North America. It has been reported from all 6 New England states plus Québec, Ontario, New York State, Michigan, Wisconsin, Colorado, Ukraine, Moldova, Romania, China, Greenland, Kazakhstan, Mongolia, Russia, Turkey, France, England, Scotland, Wales, Germany, Denmark, Norway, Sweden, Finland, Poland, Italy, Czech Republic, Austria, Slovakia, Estonia, Lithuania, Latvia, Belarus, Hungary, Croatia and Bosnia-Hercegovina. It grows on disturbed sites such as roadsides, ditches, cultivated fields, etc.
