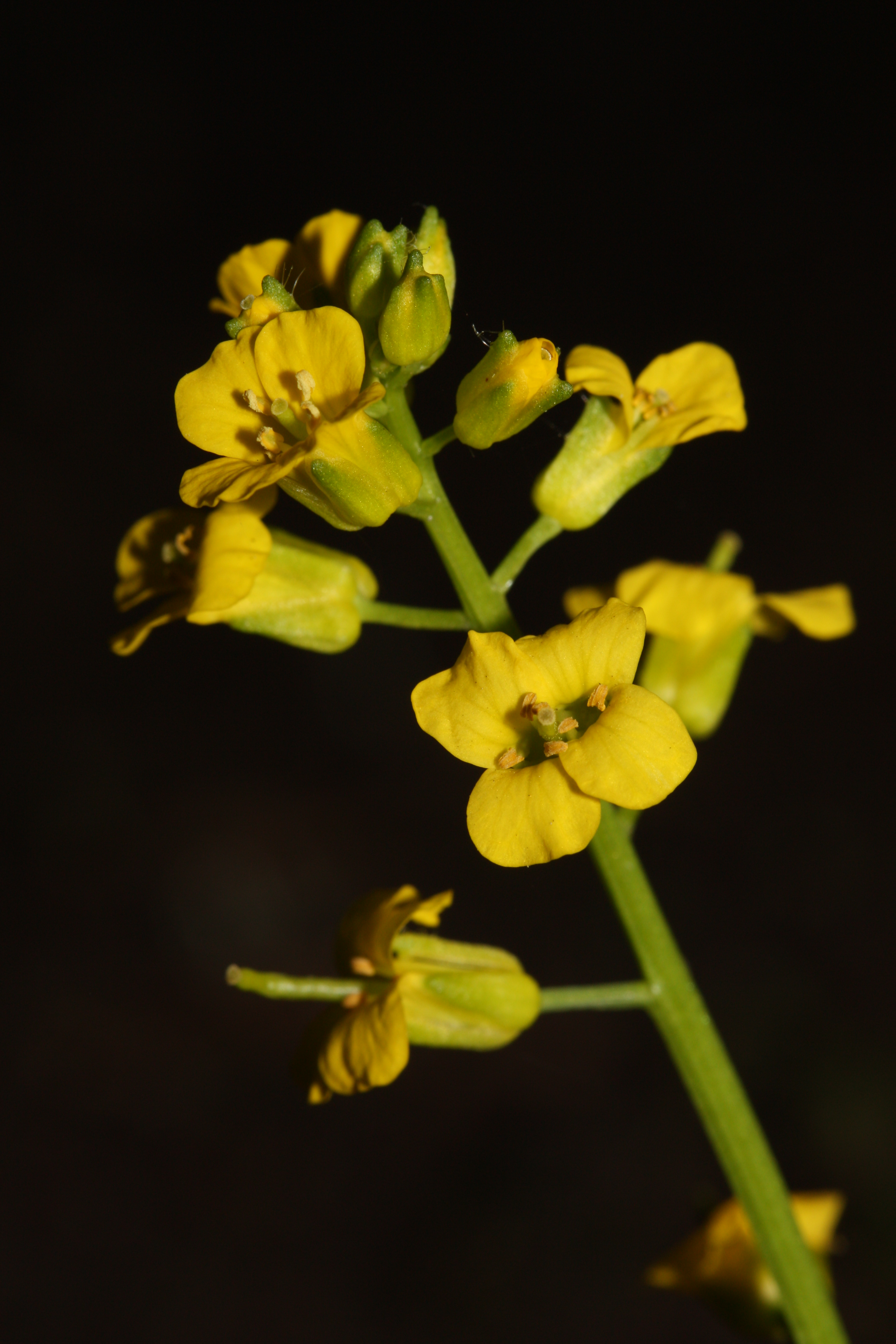

Conservation status
- Secure (NatureServe)

Scientific classification
- Kingdom: Plantae
- Clade: Tracheophytes
- Clade: Angiosperms
- Clade: Eudicots
- Clade: Rosids
- Order: Brassicales
- Family: Brassicaceae
- Genus: Barbarea
- Species: B. orthoceras

Binomial name
- Barbarea orthoceras Ledeb.

Synonyms
- Barbarea americana

= Barbarea orthoceras =

Species of flowering plant

Barbarea orthoceras is a species of flowering plant in the family Brassicaceae known by the common name American yellowrocket. It is native to North America, including much of Canada and the western United States, as well as parts of Asia. It grows in moist areas such as meadows and riverbanks. This is a perennial herb producing a stiff, branching stem to heights between 10 and 60 centimeters. The leaves are a few centimeters long and generally oval in shape with several rounded lobes toward the end. The inflorescence is a spike or cluster of bright yellow flowers at the tip of each stem branch. The fruit is a straight, narrow silique up to 5 centimeters long.

The leaves can be eaten raw or cooked, and the roots can have a horseradish-like flavor.
