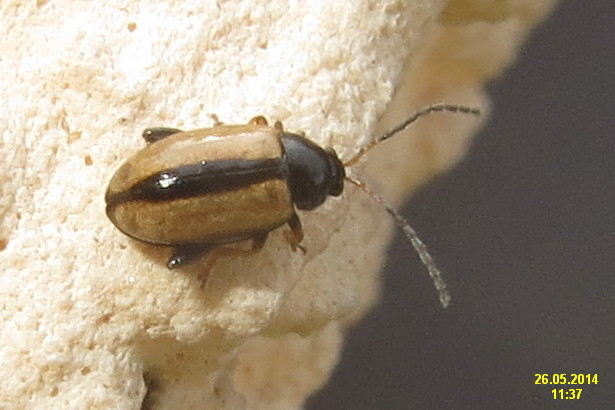

Scientific classification
- Kingdom: Animalia
- Phylum: Arthropoda
- Class: Insecta
- Order: Coleoptera
- Suborder: Polyphaga
- Infraorder: Cucujiformia
- Family: Chrysomelidae
- Genus: Phyllotreta
- Species: P. undulata

Binomial name
- Phyllotreta undulata (Kutschera, 1860)

= Phyllotreta undulata =

Species of beetle

Phyllotreta undulata, known generally as the small striped flea beetle or turnip flea beetle, is a species of flea beetle in the family Chrysomelidae. It is found in Australia, Europe and Northern Asia (excluding China), North America, and Oceania.

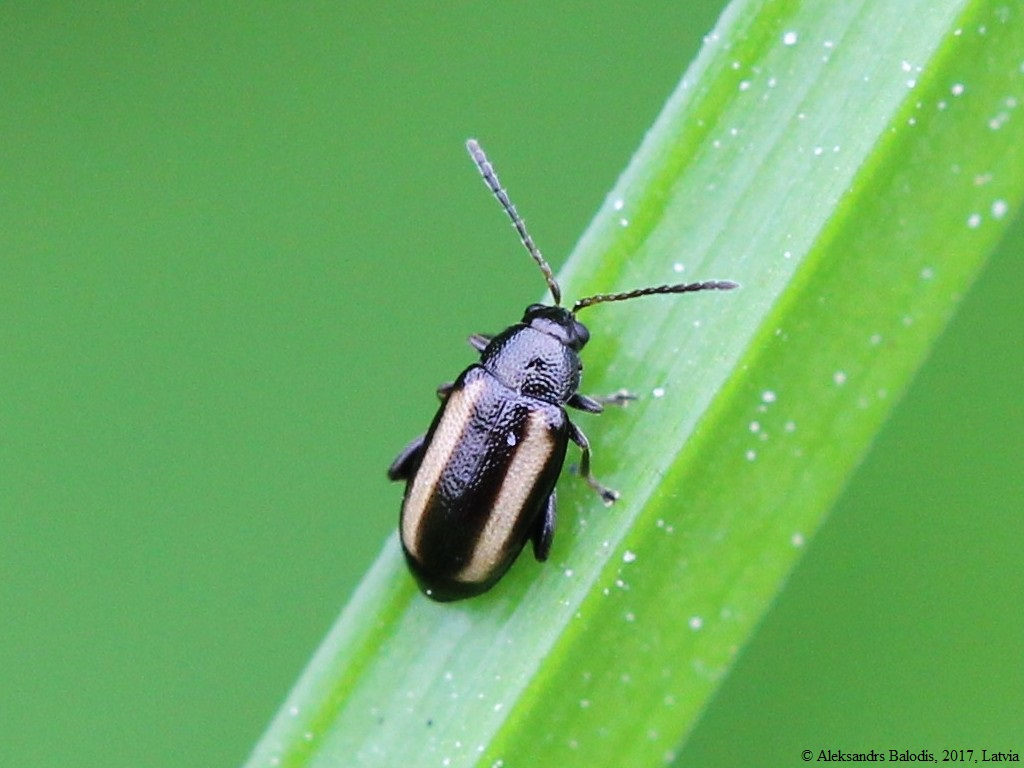
Small striped flea beetle, Phyllotreta undulata

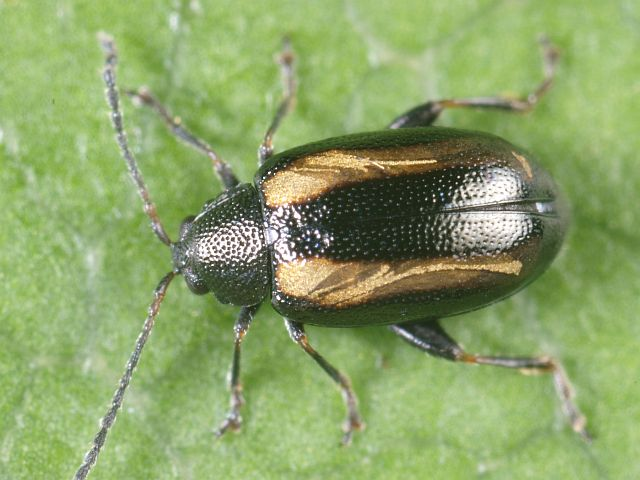
Small striped flea beetle, Phyllotreta undulata
