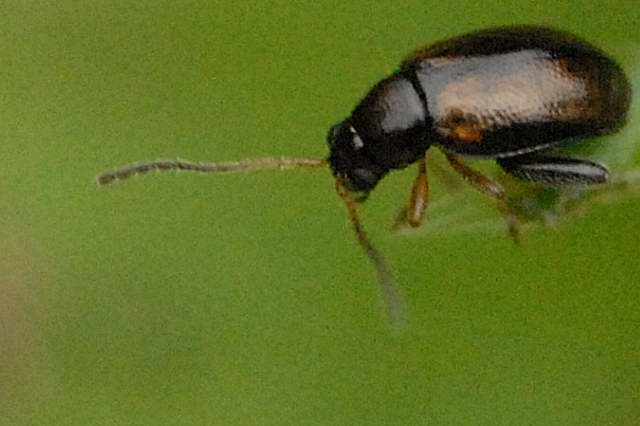
- Phyllotreta cruciferae

Scientific classification
- Kingdom: Animalia
- Phylum: Arthropoda
- Class: Insecta
- Order: Coleoptera
- Suborder: Polyphaga
- Infraorder: Cucujiformia
- Family: Chrysomelidae
- Subfamily: Galerucinae
- Tribe: Alticini
- Genus: Phyllotreta; Chevrolat, 1836

= Phyllotreta =

Genus of beetles

Phyllotreta is a genus of flea beetles in the family Chrysomelidae. There are at least 300 described species worldwide.

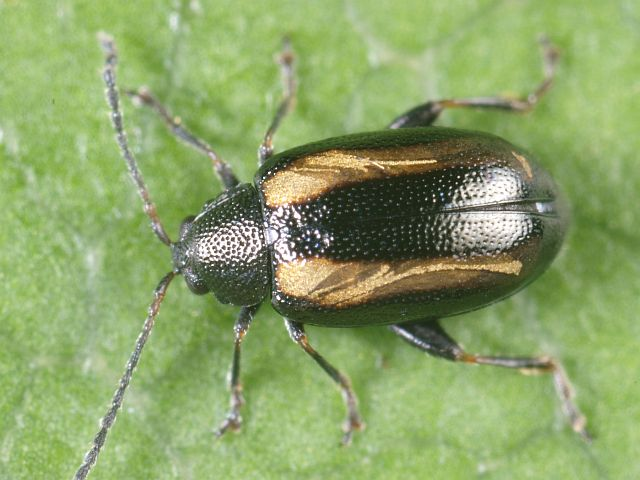
Phyllotreta undulata

== Agricultural pests ==
Many species have been recorded as pests of millets and sorghum

== See also ==
- List of Phyllotreta species
