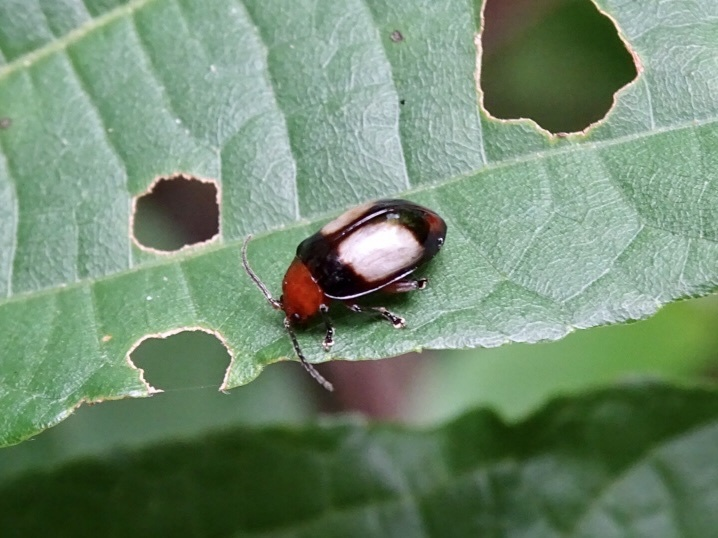
- Phygasia ornata, Hong Kong

Scientific classification
- Kingdom: Animalia
- Phylum: Arthropoda
- Class: Insecta
- Order: Coleoptera
- Suborder: Polyphaga
- Infraorder: Cucujiformia
- Family: Chrysomelidae
- Subfamily: Galerucinae
- Tribe: Alticini
- Genus: Phygasia
- Species: P. ornata

Binomial name
- Phygasia ornata Baly, 1876

= Phygasia ornata =

Species of flea beetle

Phygasia ornata is a species of flea beetle in the family Chrysomelidae. It is found in eastern and southeastern Asia (China, Taiwan, Myanmar, Andaman Islands (India)).
