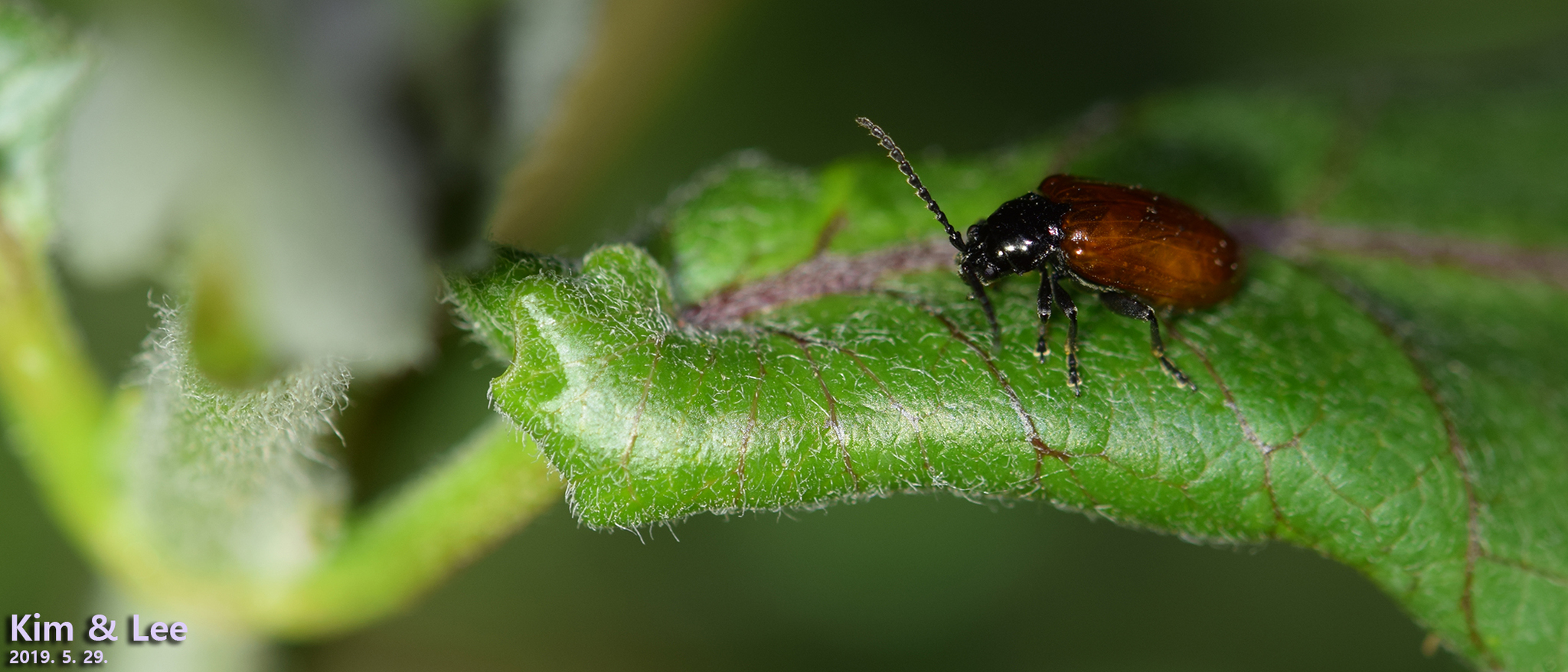
- Phygasia fulvipennis, South Korea

Scientific classification
- Kingdom: Animalia
- Phylum: Arthropoda
- Class: Insecta
- Order: Coleoptera
- Suborder: Polyphaga
- Infraorder: Cucujiformia
- Family: Chrysomelidae
- Subfamily: Galerucinae
- Tribe: Alticini
- Genus: Phygasia; Baly, 1876

= Phygasia =

Genus of flea beetles

Phygasia is a genus of flea beetles in the family Chrysomelidae. There are around 70 described species in Phygasia, found in the Palearctic, Indomalaya, and tropical Africa.

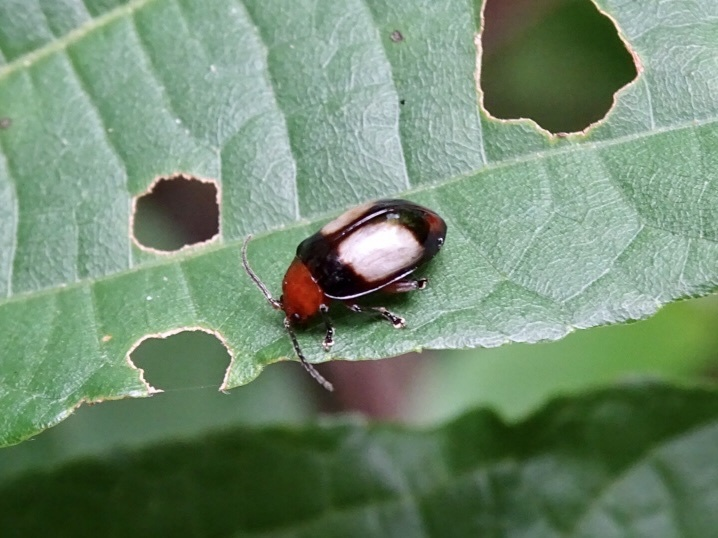
Phygasia ornata, Hong Kong

== Species ==
These species belong to the genus Phygasia:

- Phygasia africana Chapuis, 1875
- Phygasia basalis Kimoto, 2000
- Phygasia carinipennis Chen & Wang, 1980
- Phygasia chengi Lee, 2012
- Phygasia cobosi Madar & Madar, 1965
- Phygasia cyanea Medvedev, 1995
- Phygasia diancangana Wang, 1992
- Phygasia diluta Chûjô, 1963
- Phygasia dorsata Balý, 1878
- Phygasia eschata Gressitt & Kimoto, 1963
- Phygasia foveolata Wang, 1992
- Phygasia fulvipennis (Balý, 1874)
- Phygasia gracilicornis Wang & Yang, 2008
- Phygasia heikertingeri Peyerimhoff, 1929
- Phygasia hookeri Balý, 1876
- Phygasia indochinensis Medvedev, 1995
- Phygasia marginata Medvedev, 1995
- Phygasia media Chen & Wang, 1980
- Phygasia minuta Medvedev, 2001
- Phygasia nigricollis Wang & Yang, 2008
- Phygasia ornata Balý, 1876
- Phygasia pallidipennis Chen & Wang, 1980
- Phygasia parva Wang & Yang, 2008
- Phygasia potanini Lopatin, 1995
- Phygasia pseudomedia Wang & Yang, 2008
- Phygasia pseudornata Wang & Yang, 2008
- Phygasia quadriplagiata (Swartz, 1808)
- Phygasia ruficollis Wang in Wang & Yu, 1993
- Phygasia silacea (Illiger, 1807)
- Phygasia simidorsata Ge, Wang, Li & Yang, 2008
- Phygasia sulphuripennis Jacoby, 1899
- Phygasia suturalis Ge, Wang, Li & Yang, 2008
- Phygasia taiwanensis Ge, Wang, & Yang, 2010
- Phygasia tricolora Medvedev, 1995
- Phygasia unicolor (Olivier, 1808)
- Phygasia yunnana Wang & Yang, 2008
