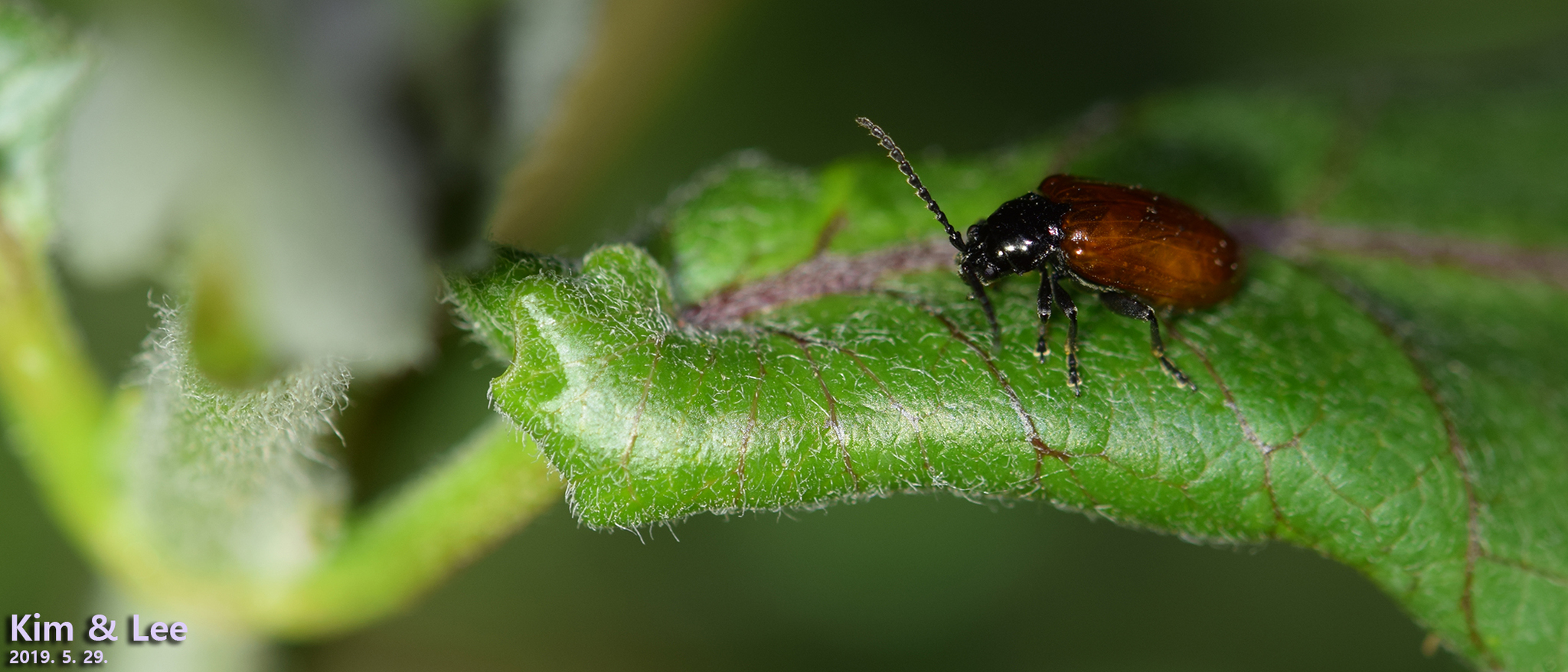
- Phygasia fulvipennis, South Korea

Scientific classification
- Kingdom: Animalia
- Phylum: Arthropoda
- Class: Insecta
- Order: Coleoptera
- Suborder: Polyphaga
- Infraorder: Cucujiformia
- Family: Chrysomelidae
- Genus: Phygasia
- Species: P. fulvipennis

Binomial name
- Phygasia fulvipennis (Baly, 1874)

Synonyms
- Graptodera fulvipennis Baly, 1874

= Phygasia fulvipennis =

Species of flea beetle

Phygasia fulvipennis is a species of flea beetle in the family Chrysomelidae. It is found in eastern Asia (China, Korea, Japan, Russia).

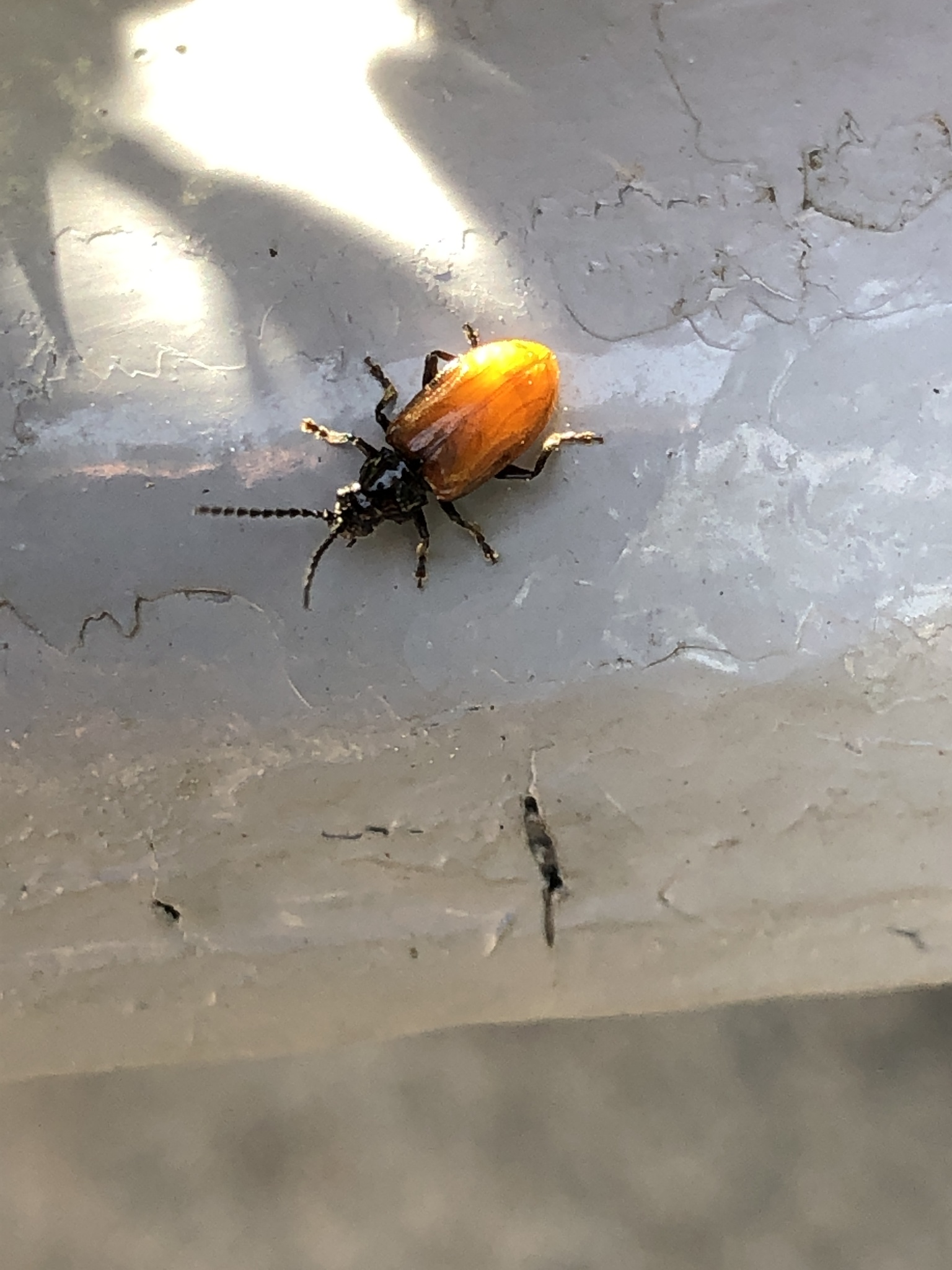
Phygasia fulvipennis, South Korea
