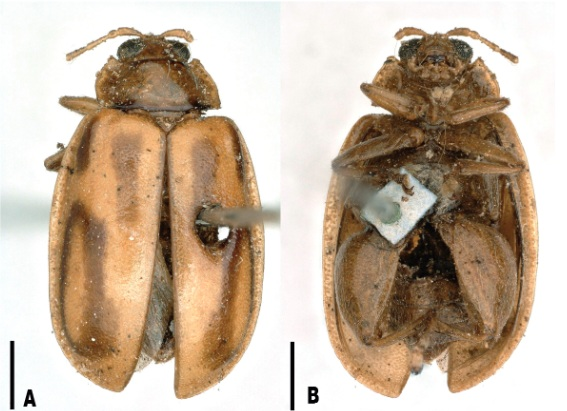

Scientific classification
- Kingdom: Animalia
- Phylum: Arthropoda
- Class: Insecta
- Order: Coleoptera
- Suborder: Polyphaga
- Infraorder: Cucujiformia
- Family: Chrysomelidae
- Genus: Walterianella
- Species: W. oculata

Binomial name
- Walterianella oculata (Fabricius, 1801)

Synonyms
- Galleruca oculata Fabricius, 1801

= Walterianella oculata =

Species of beetle

Walterianella oculata is a species of beetle of the family Chrysomelidae. This species is found in South America.
