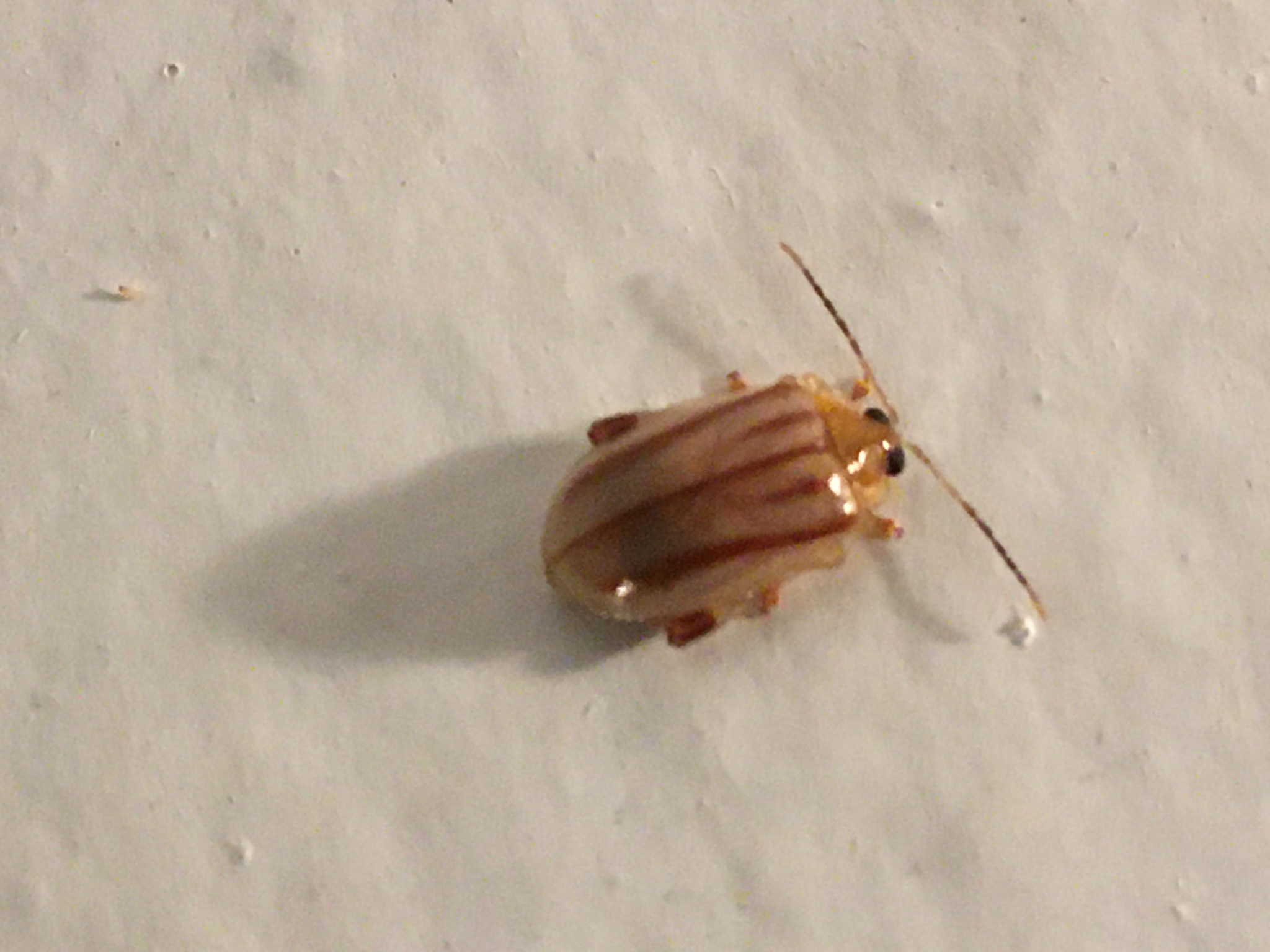
- Walterianella sublineata, Guatemala

Scientific classification
- Kingdom: Animalia
- Phylum: Arthropoda
- Class: Insecta
- Order: Coleoptera
- Suborder: Polyphaga
- Infraorder: Cucujiformia
- Family: Chrysomelidae
- Subfamily: Galerucinae
- Tribe: Alticini
- Subtribe: Oedionychina
- Genus: Walterianella; Bechyné, 1955

= Walterianella =

Genus of flea beetles

Walterianella is a genus of flea beetles in the family Chrysomelidae. There are more than 40 described species in Walterianella. They are found in Central and South America.

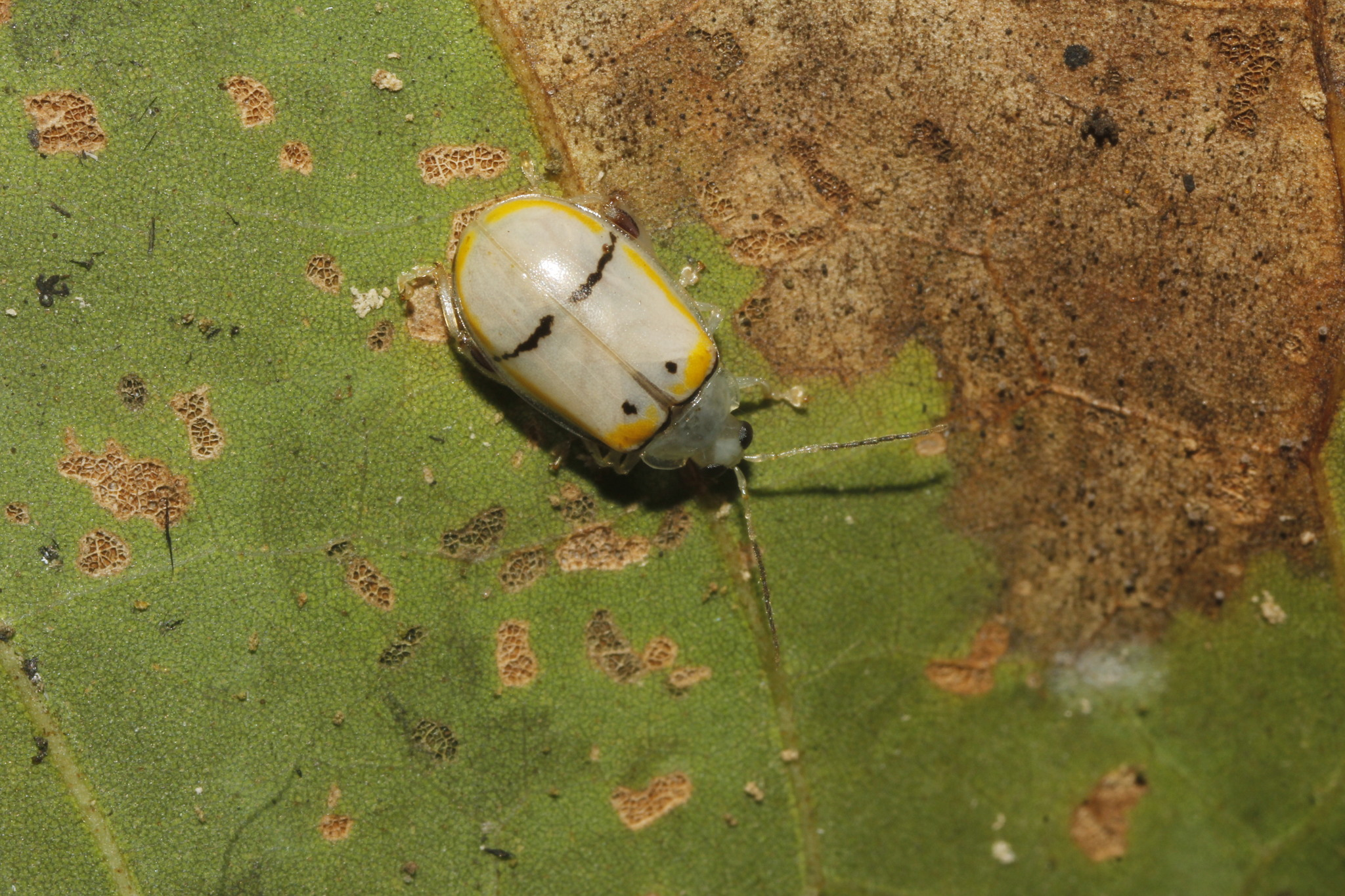
Walterianella tenuicincta, México

== Species ==
These 47 species belong to the genus Walterianella:

- Walterianella albipennis (Jacoby, 1894)
- Walterianella amazona (Bowditch)
- Walterianella apicicornis (Jacoby)
- Walterianella argentiniensis (Jacoby)
- Walterianella atropunctata (Jacoby, 1905)
- Walterianella biarcuata (Chevrolat, 1834)
- Walterianella bondari Bechyné & Bechyné, 1977
- Walterianella bucki Bechyné, 1956
- Walterianella callipoda Bechyné, 1955
- Walterianella centromaculata (Jacoby)
- Walterianella championi
- Walterianella colombiana (Jacoby)
- Walterianella decora (Jacoby)
- Walterianella diascopica Bechyné, 1958
- Walterianella diversa (Jacoby)
- Walterianella durangoensis (Jacoby, 1892)
- Walterianella eleagna Bechyné, 1955
- Walterianella exclamationis (Jacoby)
- Walterianella fuscoannulata (Jacoby)
- Walterianella gouini Bechyné, 1958
- Walterianella hackmani (Jacoby)
- Walterianella humeralis (Fabricius, 1801)
- Walterianella humilis (Illiger, 1807)
- Walterianella informis (Jacoby, 1905)
- Walterianella ingrata (Jacoby)
- Walterianella inscripta (Jacoby, 1886)
- Walterianella interruptovittata (Jacoby, 1905)
- Walterianella nigrobasalis (Jacoby, 1905)
- Walterianella nigronotata (Jacoby)
- Walterianella oculatus (Fabricius, 1801)
- Walterianella ophthalmica (Harold)
- Walterianella pallidocincta (Jacoby)
- Walterianella palpalis (Jacoby, 1894)
- Walterianella parallina (Jacoby)
- Walterianella peruviana (Jacoby)
- Walterianella propugnaculum (Illiger, 1807)
- Walterianella quadripunctata (Schaufuss, 1874)
- Walterianella sellata (Fabricius, 1801)
- Walterianella signata (Jacoby, 1886)
- Walterianella similis (Bowditch)
- Walterianella spilota (Balý, 1878)
- Walterianella sublineata (Jacoby, 1886)
- Walterianella tabida (Jacoby, 1894)
- Walterianella tenuicincta (Jacoby, 1886)
- Walterianella transversalis (Jacoby, 1886)
- Walterianella venustula (Schaufuss, 1874)
- Walterianella xanthomelaena Bechyné, 1955
