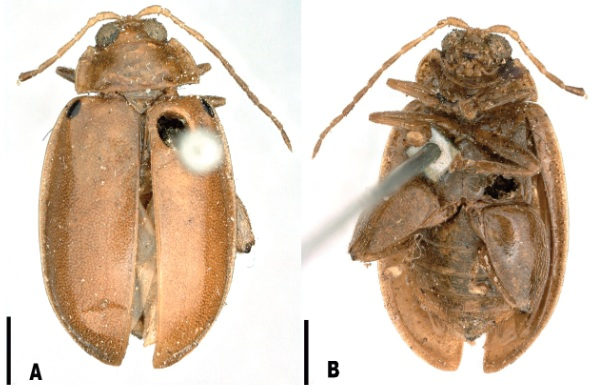

Scientific classification
- Kingdom: Animalia
- Phylum: Arthropoda
- Class: Insecta
- Order: Coleoptera
- Suborder: Polyphaga
- Infraorder: Cucujiformia
- Family: Chrysomelidae
- Genus: Walterianella
- Species: W. humeralis

Binomial name
- Walterianella humeralis (Fabricius, 1801)

Synonyms
- Galleruca humeralis Fabricius, 1801

= Walterianella humeralis =

Species of beetle

Walterianella humeralis is a species of beetle of the family Chrysomelidae. This species is found in Costa Rica and Panama.
