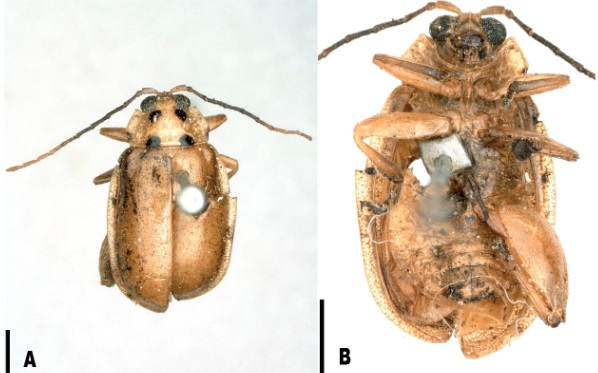

Scientific classification
- Kingdom: Animalia
- Phylum: Arthropoda
- Class: Insecta
- Order: Coleoptera
- Suborder: Polyphaga
- Infraorder: Cucujiformia
- Family: Chrysomelidae
- Genus: Walterianella
- Species: W. sellata

Binomial name
- Walterianella sellata (Fabricius, 1801)

Synonyms
- Galleruca sellata Fabricius, 1801

= Walterianella sellata =

Species of beetle

Walterianella sellata is a species of beetle of the family Chrysomelidae. This species is found in South America.
