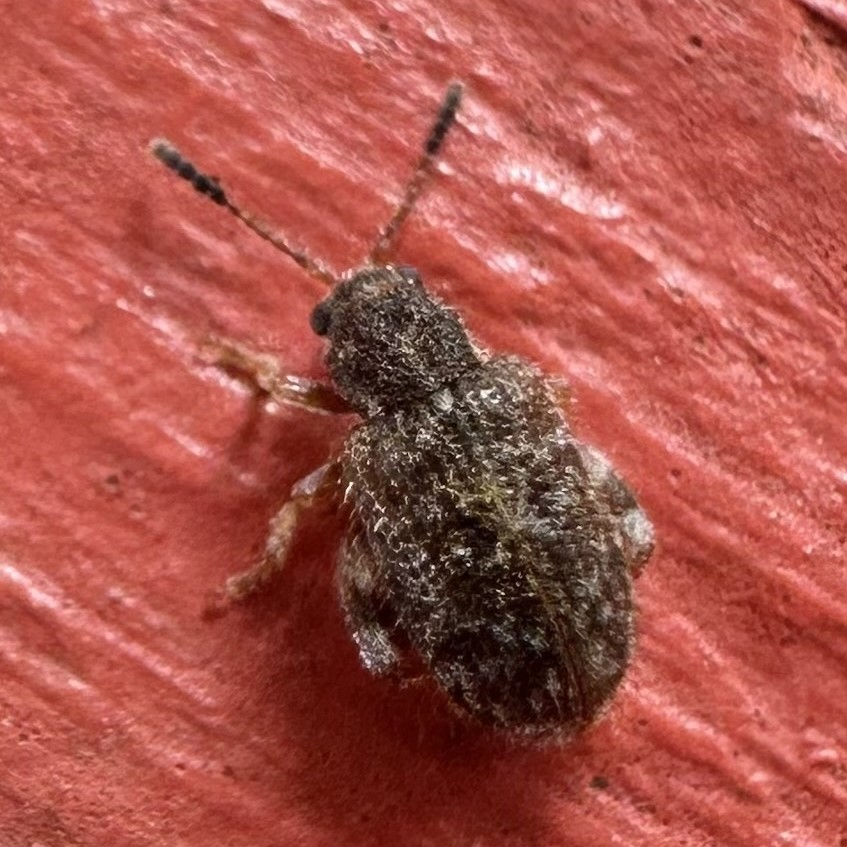

Scientific classification
- Kingdom: Animalia
- Phylum: Arthropoda
- Class: Insecta
- Order: Coleoptera
- Suborder: Polyphaga
- Infraorder: Cucujiformia
- Family: Chrysomelidae
- Subfamily: Galerucinae
- Tribe: Alticini
- Genus: Distigmoptera; Blake, 1943

= Distigmoptera =

Genus of beetles

Distigmoptera is a genus of flea beetles in the family Chrysomelidae. There are 16 described species in the genus Distigmoptera. They are found in North America and the Neotropics.

== Selected species ==
- Distigmoptera apicalis Blake, 1943
- Distigmoptera borealis Blake, 1943
- Distigmoptera brevihirta Blake
- Distigmoptera capillosa Blake
- Distigmoptera chamorrae Konstantinov & Konstantinova, 2011
- Distigmoptera chrysodaedala Blake, 1951
- Distigmoptera falli Blake, 1943
- Distigmoptera foveolata Balsbaugh, 1968
- Distigmoptera impennata Blake, 1943
- Distigmoptera mesochorea Blake, 1943
- Distigmoptera orchidophila Blake, 1951
- Distigmoptera pilosa (Illiger, 1807)
- Distigmoptera schwarzi Blake, 1943
- Distigmoptera texana Blake, 1943
