= Distigmoptera impennata =

Scientific classification
- Kingdom: Animalia
- Phylum: Arthropoda
- Class: Insecta
- Order: Coleoptera
- Suborder: Polyphaga
- Infraorder: Cucujiformia
- Family: Chrysomelidae
- Tribe: Alticini
- Genus: Distigmoptera
- Species: D. impennata

Binomial name
- Distigmoptera impennata Blake, 1943

Species of beetle

Distigmoptera impennata is a species of flea beetle in the family Chrysomelidae. It is found in North America.
