= Lysathia ludoviciana =

Scientific classification
- Kingdom: Animalia
- Phylum: Arthropoda
- Class: Insecta
- Order: Coleoptera
- Suborder: Polyphaga
- Infraorder: Cucujiformia
- Family: Chrysomelidae
- Tribe: Alticini
- Genus: Lysathia
- Species: L. ludoviciana

Binomial name
- Lysathia ludoviciana (Fall, 1910)

Species of beetle

Lysathia ludoviciana, the water-primrose flea beetle, is a species of flea beetle in the family Chrysomelidae. It is found in the Caribbean Sea, Central America, and North America.
