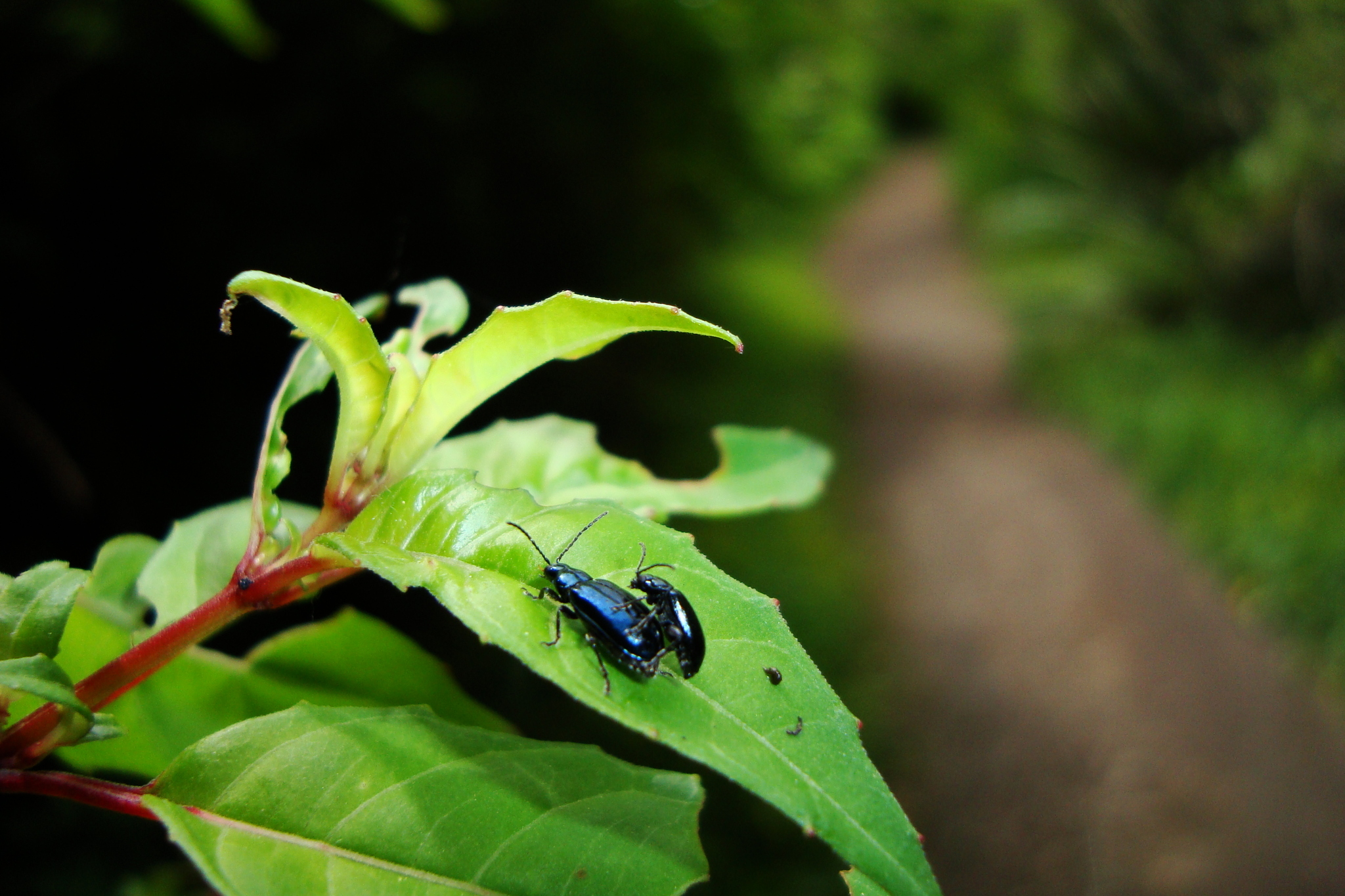
- Lysathia atrocyanea

Scientific classification
- Kingdom: Animalia
- Phylum: Arthropoda
- Class: Insecta
- Order: Coleoptera
- Suborder: Polyphaga
- Infraorder: Cucujiformia
- Family: Chrysomelidae
- Subfamily: Galerucinae
- Tribe: Alticini
- Genus: Lysathia; J. Bechyné, 1957

= Lysathia =

Genus of beetles

Lysathia is a genus of flea beetles in the family Chrysomelidae. There are 10 described species, found in North America and the Neotropics.

== Selected species ==
- Lysathia aenea Bechyné, 1959
- Lysathia atrocyanea
- Lysathia comasagua
- Lysathia ludoviciana (Fall, 1910) (water-primrose flea beetle)
- Lysathia occidentalis (Suffrian, 1868)
- Lysathia vulcanica
