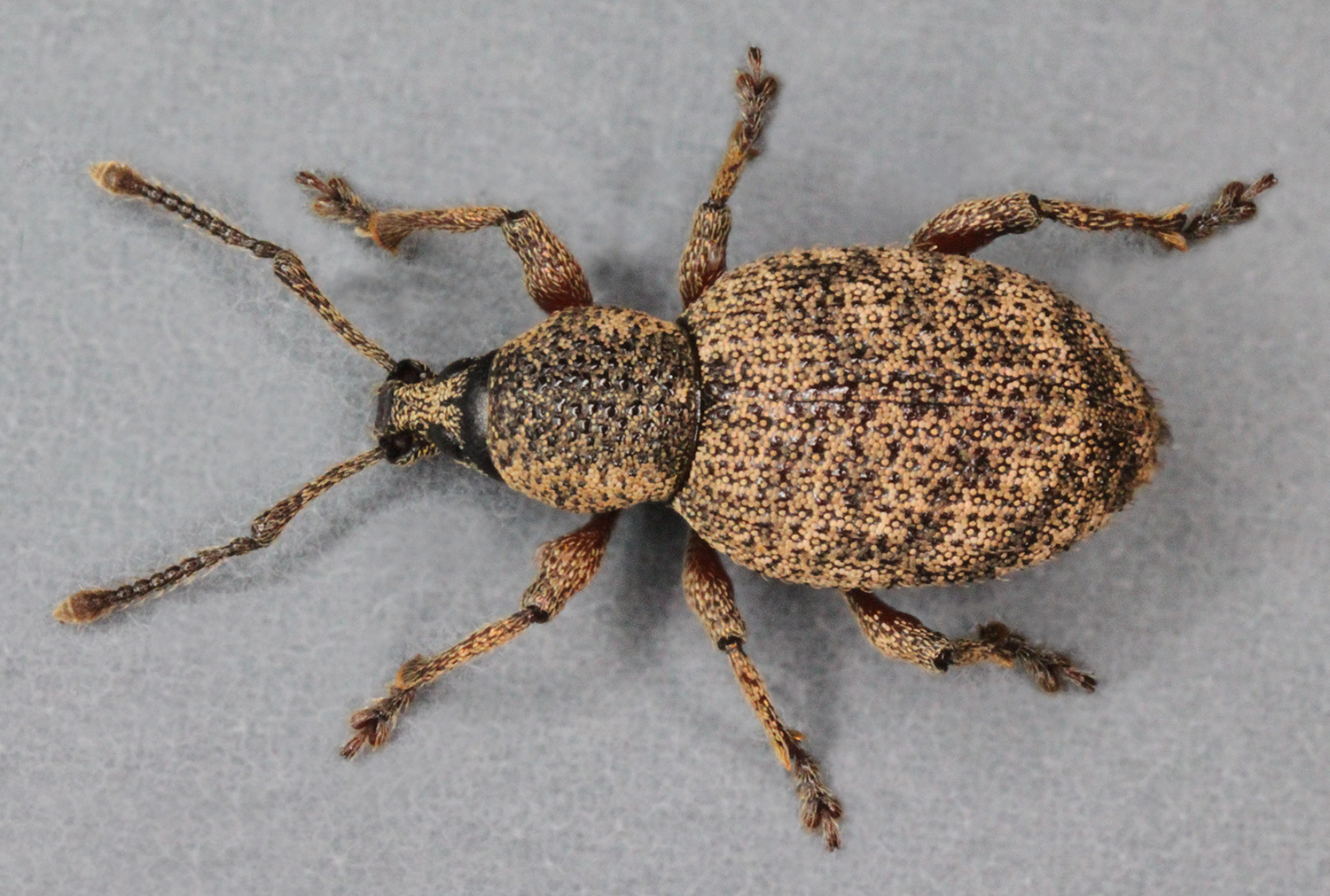
- Otiorhynchus singularis

Scientific classification
- Kingdom: Animalia
- Phylum: Arthropoda
- Clade: Pancrustacea
- Class: Insecta
- Order: Coleoptera
- Suborder: Polyphaga
- Infraorder: Cucujiformia
- Superfamily: Curculionoidea
- Family: Curculionidae
- Subfamily: Entiminae
- Tribe: Otiorhynchini
- Genus: Otiorhynchus
- Species: O. singularis

Binomial name
- Otiorhynchus singularis ( Linnaeus, 1767)

= Otiorhynchus singularis =

Species of beetle

Otiorhynchus singularis, the clay-coloured weevil, is a species of weevil native to Europe. It attacks a range of trees and shrubs but the main hosts are currants, gooseberry, raspberry, hops, fir trees and Norway spruce.

== Symptoms ==
The adult weevils eat buds, shoots and leaves, and in some cases damage bark. In conifers, severed needles may be scattered around the base of the tree.

== Synonyms ==
- Brachyrhinus singularis
- Curculio picipes (Fabricius, 1776)
- Curculio singularis (Linnaeus, 1767)
- Otiorhynchus corniculatus (Reitter, 1913)
- Otiorhynchus granulatus (Herbst, 1784-85)
- Otiorhynchus marquardii (Faldermann, 1836)
- Otiorhynchus notatus (Bondsdorff, 1785)
- Otiorhynchus notatus (Stephens, 1831)
- Otiorhynchus picipes ((Fabricius, 1776)
- Otiorhynchus squamiger
- Otiorhynchus vastator (Marsham, 1802)

== See also ==
The colour and morphology of weevils can vary, confusing identification. Similar weevils include :

- Vine weevil (O. sulcatus)
- Strawberry root weevil (O. ovatus)
- Phyllobius
- Polydrusus
