= List of olive pests =

Many species of insects, arachnids, and nematodes parasitise the olive tree (Olea europaea L. subsp. europaea) to the extent of being agricultural pests.

== Insects ==
Various insect species attack cultivated olive trees among which the olive fruit fly is the most economically important.

=== Diptera ===
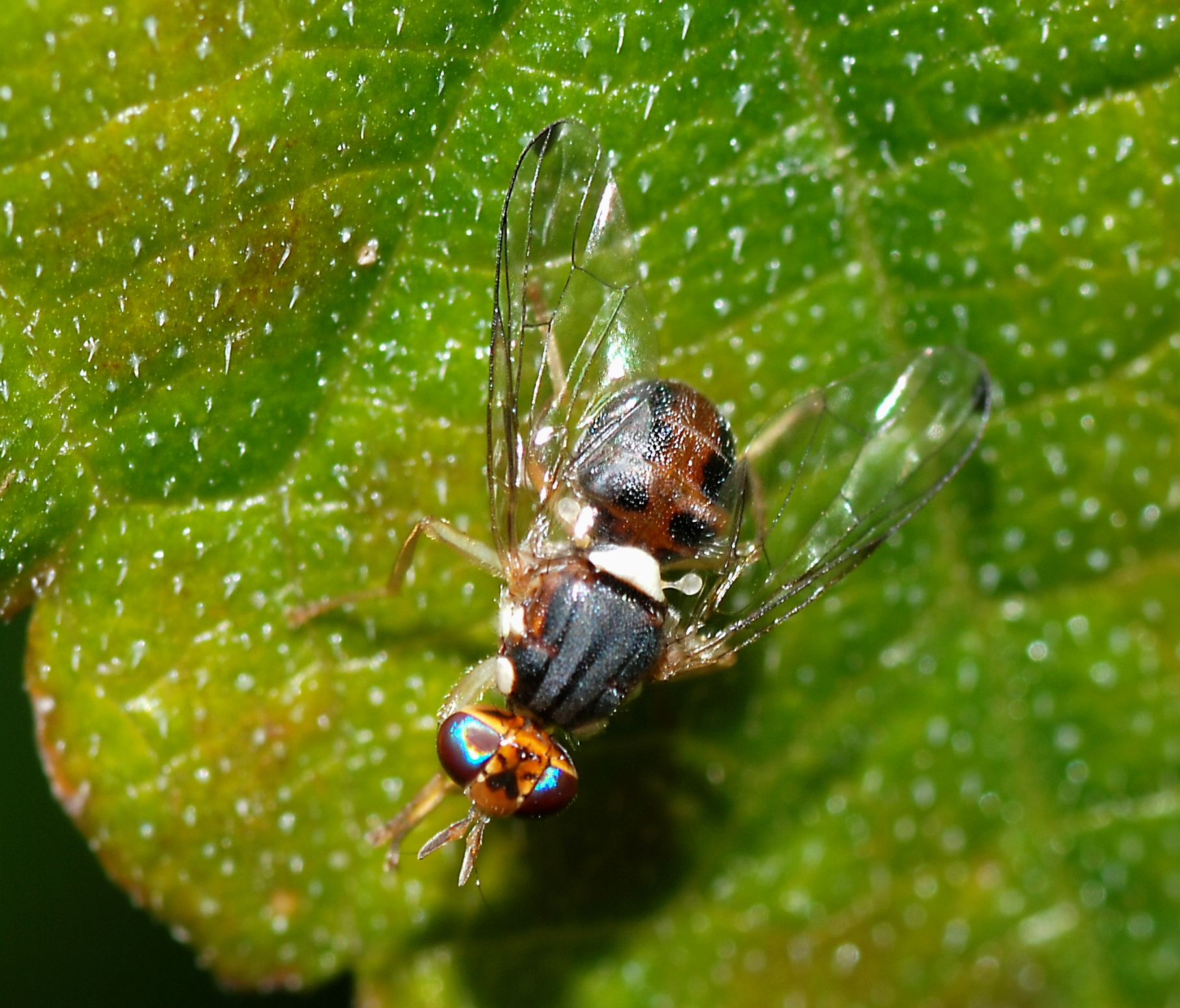
Olive fruit fly

- Bactrocera oleae (Olive fruit fly)
- Resseliella oleisuga (olive bark midge)
- Prolasioptera berlesiana (olive midge).

=== Beetles ===
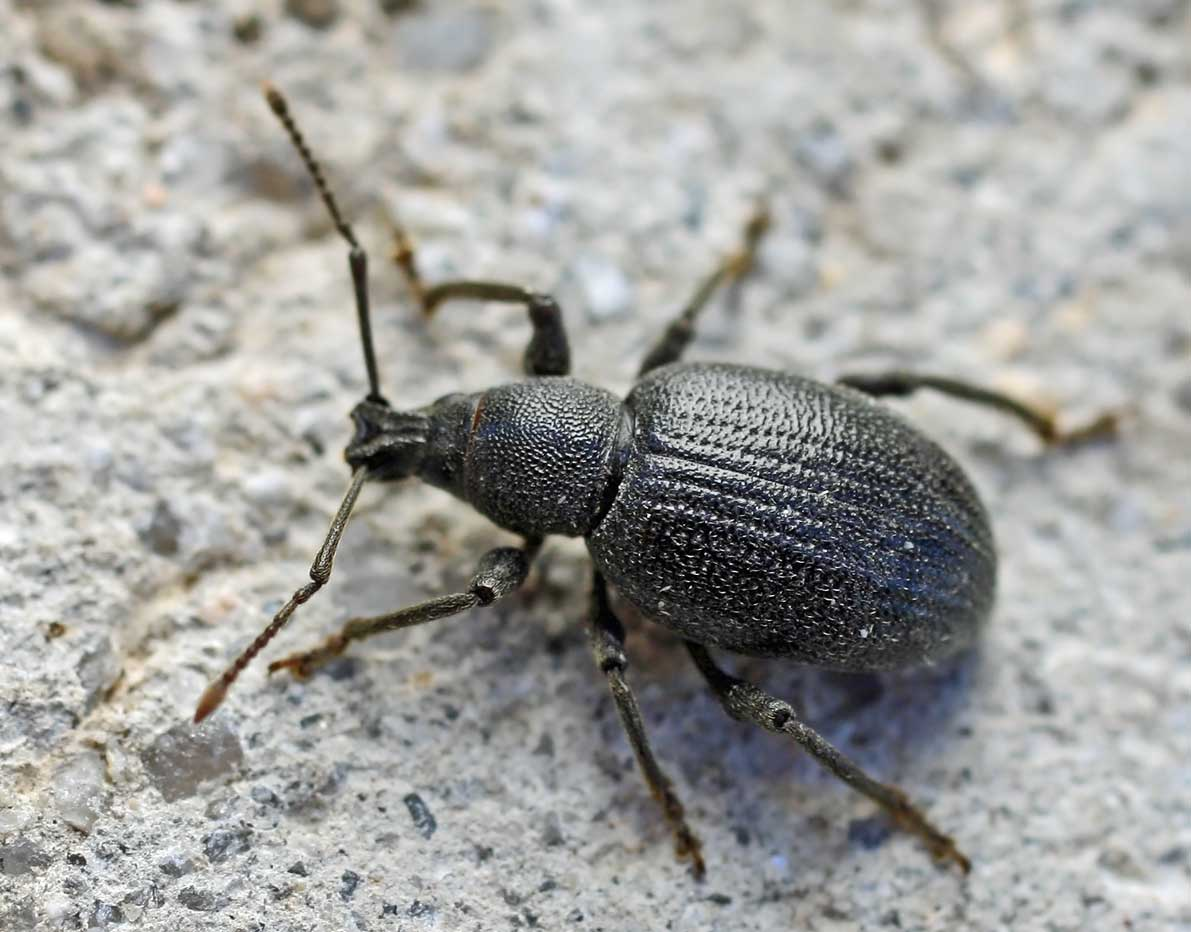
Otiorhynchus meridionalis

- Phloeotribus scarabaeoides (olive bark beetle)
- Hylesinus oleiperda (Olive tree hylesin)
- Leperesinus varius (hylesin variable)
- Zeuzera pyrina (pear tree zeuzera)
- Cionus fraxini (ash weevil)
- Otiorhyncus cribricolis (otiorhyncus of the olive tree)
- Otiorhynchus sulcatus (Vine weevil)
- Melalgus confertus (Bostrichidae) California.

=== Hemiptera ===
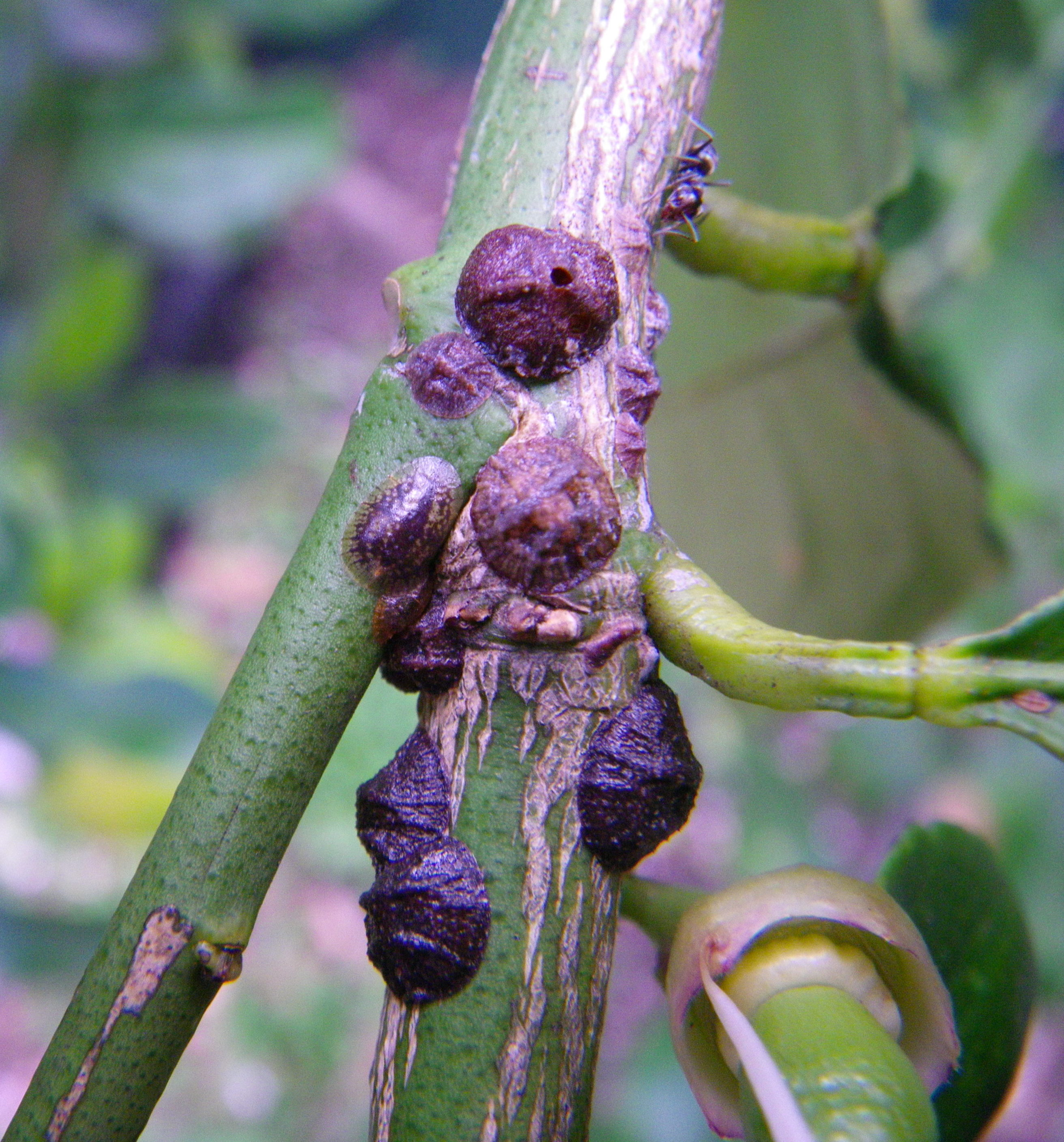
Black olive scale insects.

- Saissetia oleae (black olive scale insect)
- Parlatoria oleae (violet olive scale insect)
- Aspidiotus nerii (oleander scale insect)
- Lepidosaphes ulmi (comma scale insect)
- Aspidiotus hederae (ivy scale insect)
- Aonidiella aurantii (California red scale) California
- Euphyllura olivina (olive psyllid)
- Aleurolobus olivinus (olive black whitefly)
- Froggattia olivinia Olive lace bug (olive tree bug) a species endemic to Australia)
- Cytosoma schmeltz bladder cicada (cidadella) Australia)
- Froggattia olivinia Olive lace bug Australia)
- Hemiberlesia rapax (cochineal Califormia)
- Hemiberlesia lataniae (cochineal Califormia).

=== Lepidoptera ===
- Prays oleae (olive moth)
- Margonia unionalis = Palpita vitrealis (jasmine moth)
- Euzophera pinguis (olive trunk moth)
- Gymnoscelis rufifasciata
- Metriochroa latifoliella = Oecophyllembius neglectus) (olive leaf miner)
- Epiphyas postvittana (budworm) Australia.

=== Thysanoptera ===
- Olive Thrips
- Frankliniella occidentalis (Western flower thrips) California.

== Arachnids ==
- Oxyenus maxwelli (Olive mite Eriophyidae) California.

== Nematodes ==
Multiple nematode species parasitise and damage olive trees, including:

- Meloidogyne spp. root-knot nematodes
- Tylenchulus semipenetrans citrus nematode
- Pratylenchus spp. root lesion nematodes
