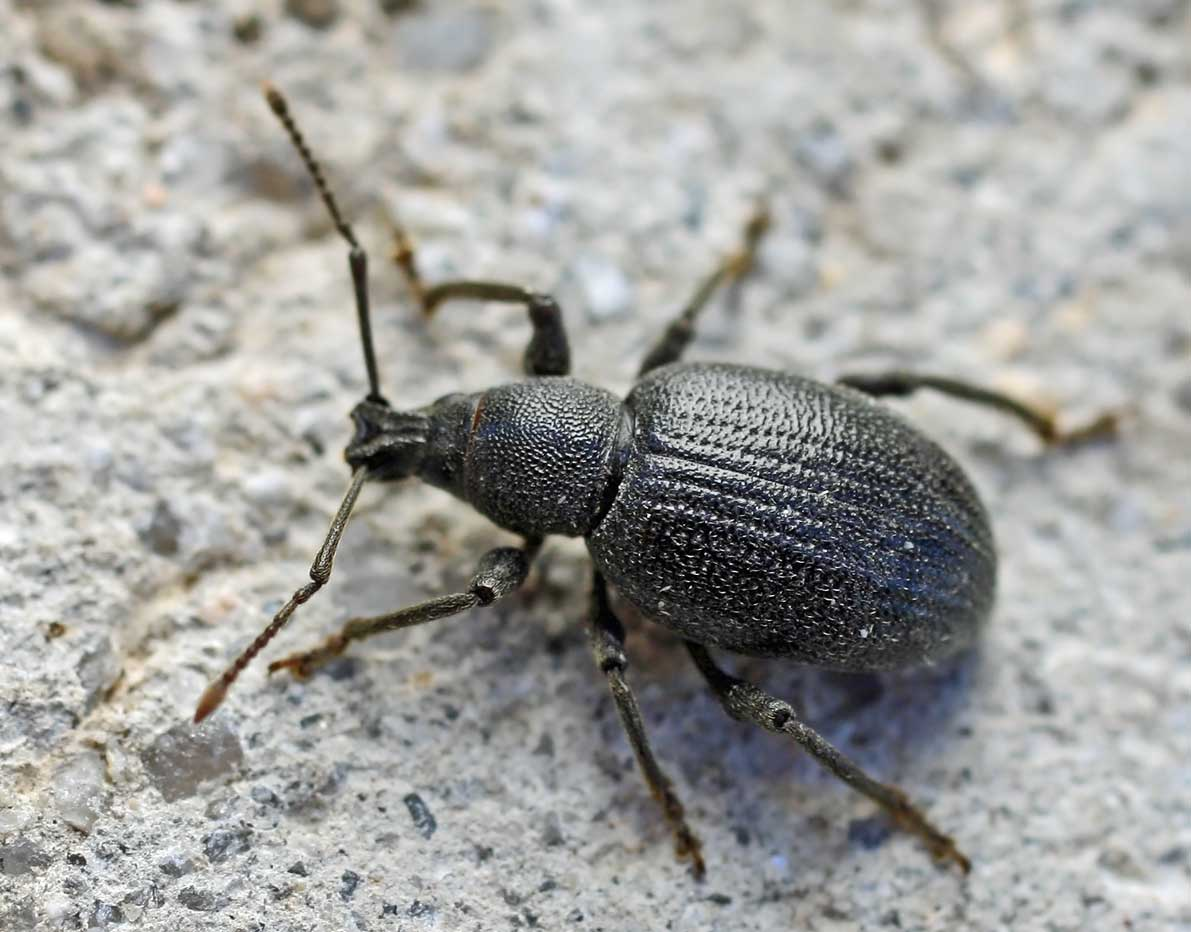

Scientific classification
- Kingdom: Animalia
- Phylum: Arthropoda
- Class: Insecta
- Order: Coleoptera
- Suborder: Polyphaga
- Infraorder: Cucujiformia
- Family: Curculionidae
- Genus: Otiorhynchus
- Species: O. meridionalis

Binomial name
- Otiorhynchus meridionalis Gyllenhal, 1834

Synonyms
- Otiorhynchus subglobosus Blanchard, 1851

= Otiorhynchus meridionalis =

Species of beetle

Otiorhynchus meridionalis, the lilac root weevil, is a species of broad-nosed weevil in the family Curculionidae. It is found in North America. Lilac root weevils are shiny, brownish-black beetles, about 0.25 inches (6 mm) with long snout (rostrum) and geniculate (elbowed) antennae. They are common landscape pests, feeding on lilac, euonymous and peonies.

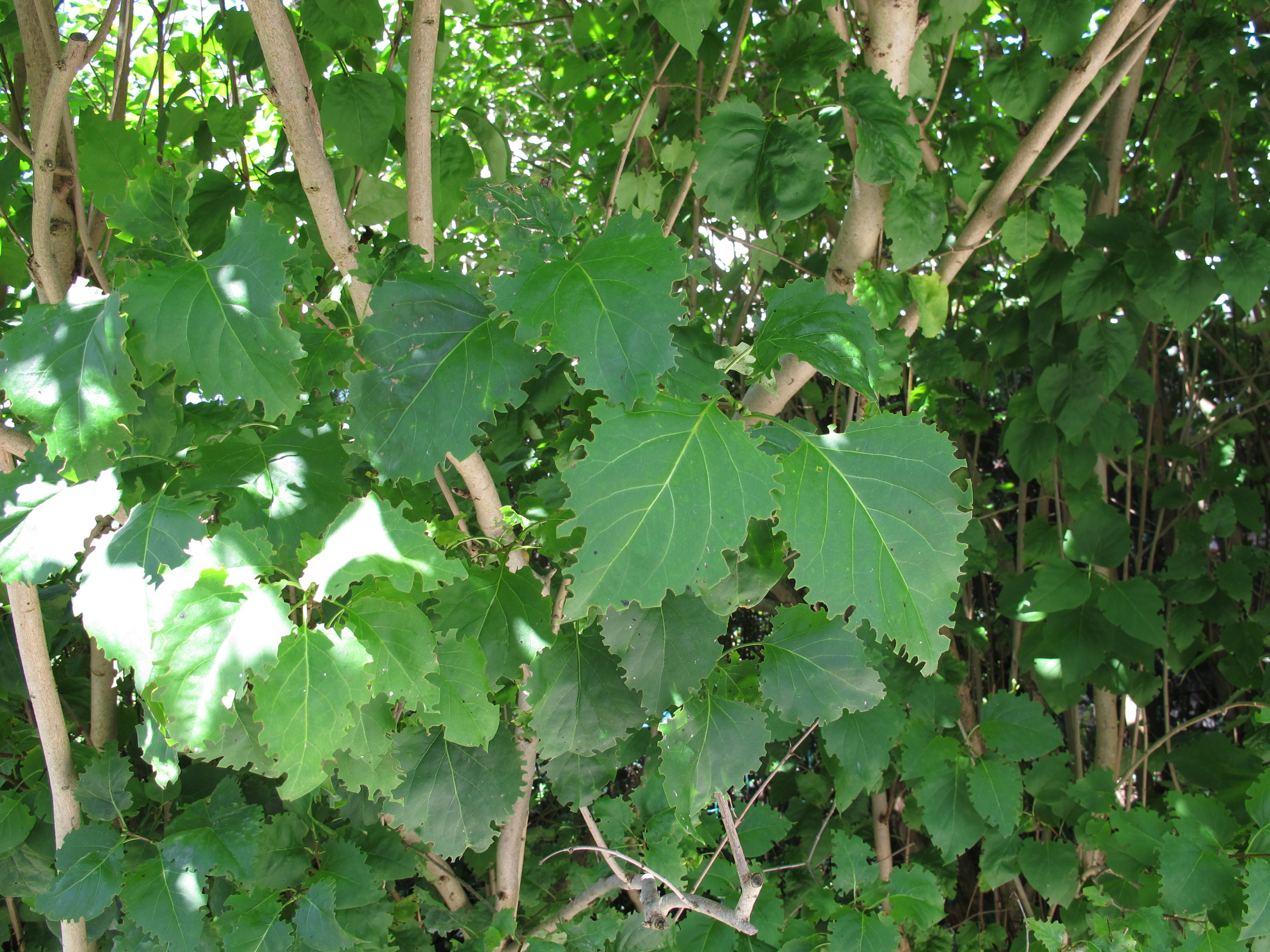
Lilac leaves eaten by the weevil

Larvae feed on plant roots, while adult insects feed on leaves, eating only the edges in form of numerous U-shaped notches. They are commonly present on North American lilac, but rarely create lasting damage to the plant.

Adult insects are nocturnal. Like other root weevils (O. ovatus, O. rugostriatus and O. sulcatus), they often wander into households during hot summer months in search for shade and moisture. Although harmless to humans, pets and furnishings, they pose a nuisance. Treatment with pyrethroid-based insecticides is recommended only in cases of severe infestations, and the occasional bug is best tolerated or removed mechanically.
