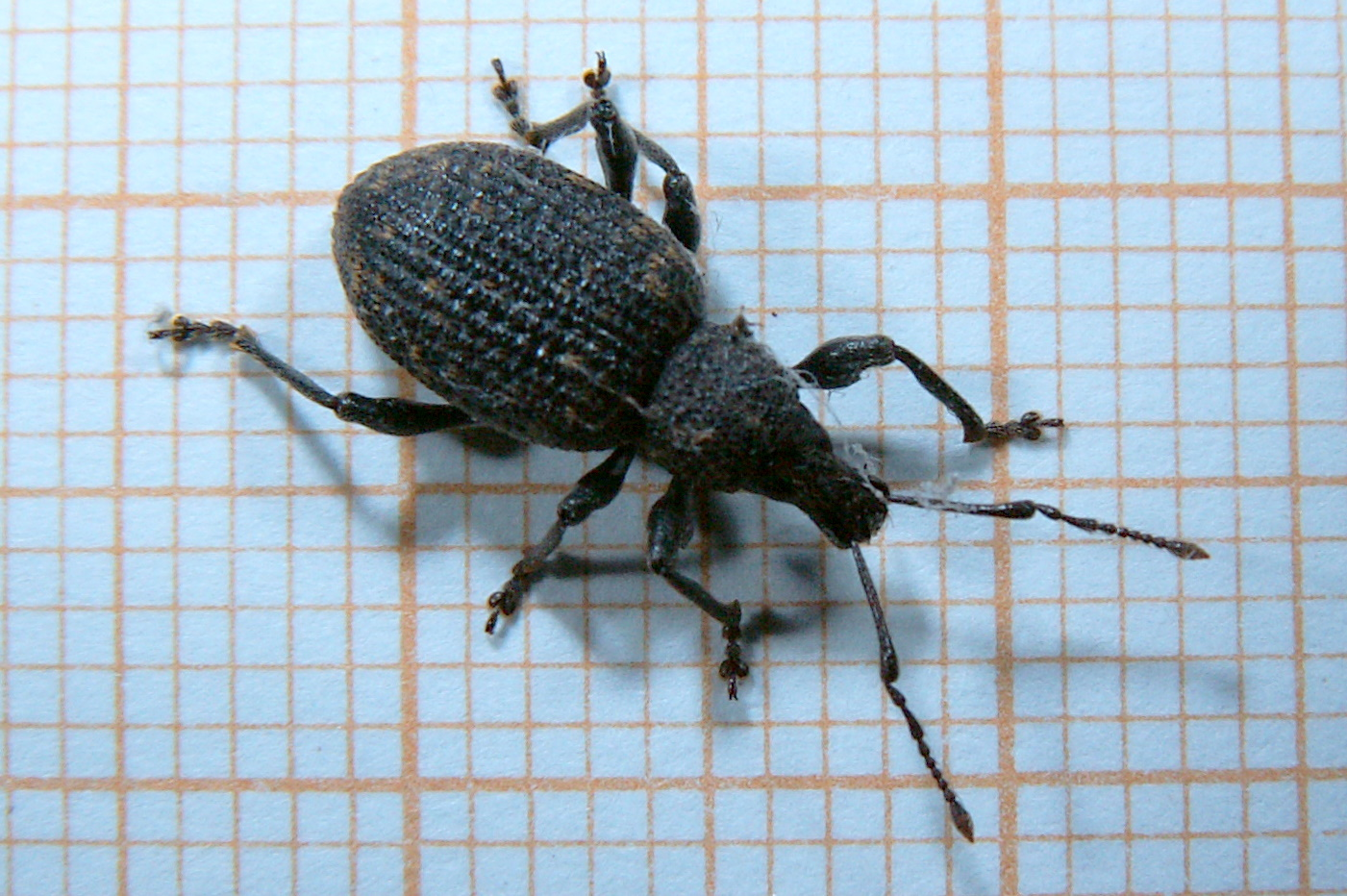
- Otiorhynchus sulcatus

Scientific classification
- Kingdom: Animalia
- Phylum: Arthropoda
- Clade: Pancrustacea
- Class: Insecta
- Order: Coleoptera
- Suborder: Polyphaga
- Infraorder: Cucujiformia
- Family: Curculionidae
- Subfamily: Entiminae
- Tribe: Otiorhynchini
- Genus: Otiorhynchus; Germar, 1824

Species
- 1500+

Synonyms
- List: Brachyrhinus Latreille, 1802 (Suppressed) (Note: A 1972 ruling by the ICZN suppressed the names Brachyrhinus, Loborhynchus, Mecocerus, and Panaphilis, and conserved the name Otiorhynchus, attributing it to Germar, 1824 (not 1822).); Pachygaster Germar, 1817 (Unavailable); Mecocerus Billberg, 1820 (Suppressed); Anlaxyrhynchus Dejean, 1821 (Unavailable); Brachyrhynchus Dejean, 1821 (Unavailable); Loborhynchus Dejean, 1821 (Unavailable); Panaphilis Dejean, 1821 (Suppressed); Tithonus Dejean, 1821 (Unavailable); Loborhynchus Schönherr, 1823 (Suppressed); Othiorynchus Latreille, 1829 (Misspelling); Othiorhynchus Krynicky, 1834 (Misspelling); Otiorhynchius Thon, 1836 (Misspelling); Panaphilus Ernst & Gruber, 1838 (Misspelling); Loborynchus Grimmer, 1841 (Misspelling); Otiorhinchus Guerin-Meneville, 1841 (Misspelling); Otiorchynchus Gistel, 1857 (Misspelling); Otiorrhynchus Gemminger & Harold, 1871 (Misspelling); Otiorhinchus Guerin-Meneville, 1841 (Misspelling); Pseudohomorythmus Pesarini, 1970 (Unavailable)

= Otiorhynchus =

Genus of beetles

Otiorhynchus (sometimes misspelled as Otiorrhynchus) is a large genus of weevils in the family Curculionidae. Many species of the genus, particularly the black vine weevil (O. sulcatus) and the strawberry root weevil (O. ovatus), are important pests, both as larvae and as adults. Larvae feed on plant roots. Adults are flightless with fused elytra and feed at night on plant foliage. In many species of the genus at least some races are polyploid and parthenogenetic, while the rest of the races and species are diploid and bisexual. Otiorhynchus weevils, particularly O. scaber, have been a popular subject for studies of the evolution of parthenogenesis. The genus is native to the Palearctic region. However, sixteen species were inadvertently introduced to North America and have become widespread there.

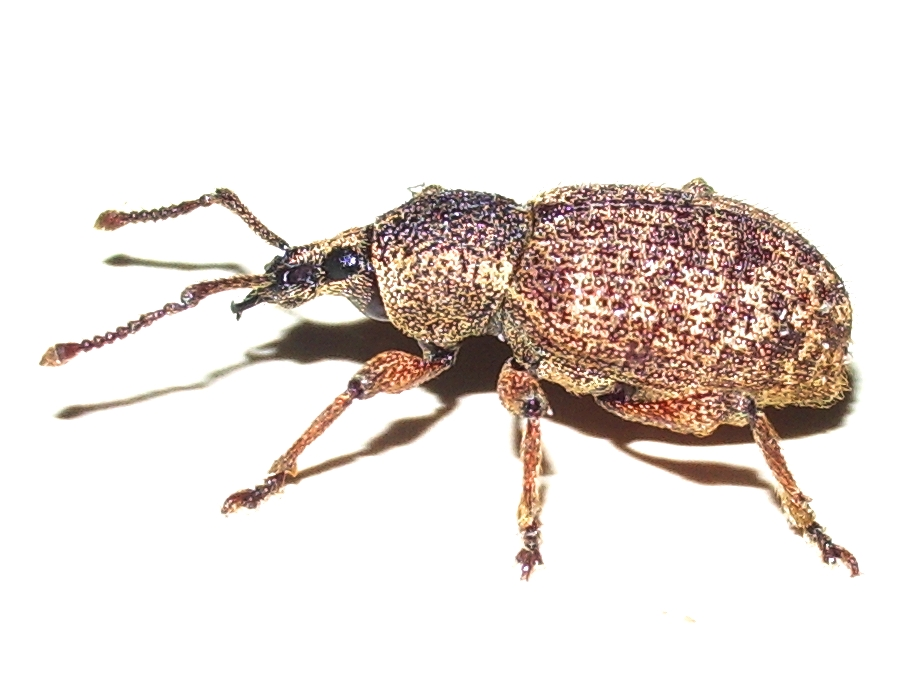
Otiorhynchus sp.

A number of species are troglobites, cave-dwelling animals that lack eyes.

There are over 1,500 species in this genus, which is divided into at least 110 subgenera.

== Species ==
Selected species:

- Otiorhynchus alpicola
- Otiorhynchus arcticus
- Otiorhynchus armadillo
- Otiorhynchus atroapterus
- Otiorhynchus crataegi
- Otiorhynchus cribricollis
- Otiorhynchus cuneiformis
- Otiorhynchus dieckmanni
- Otiorhynchus frater
- Otiorhynchus gemmatus
- Otiorhynchus grischunensis
- Otiorhynchus ligneus
- Otiorhynchus ligustici
- Otiorhynchus lugens
- Otiorhynchus magnanoi
- Otiorhynchus meridionalis
- Otiorhynchus morio
- Otiorhynchus ovatus
- Otiorhynchus porcatus
- Otiorhynchus radjai
- Otiorhynchus raucus
- Otiorhynchus rhacusensis
- Otiorhynchus rugifrons
- Otiorhynchus rugosostriatus
- Otiorhynchus scaber
- Otiorhynchus sensitivus
- Otiorhynchus singularis
- Otiorhynchus sulcatus
- Otiorhynchus vehemens
