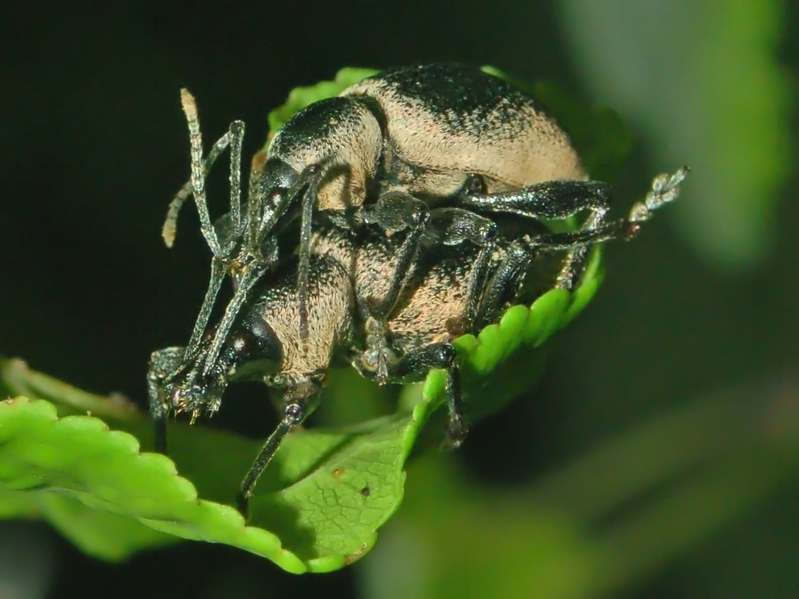
- Otiorhynchus vehemens – Mating pair
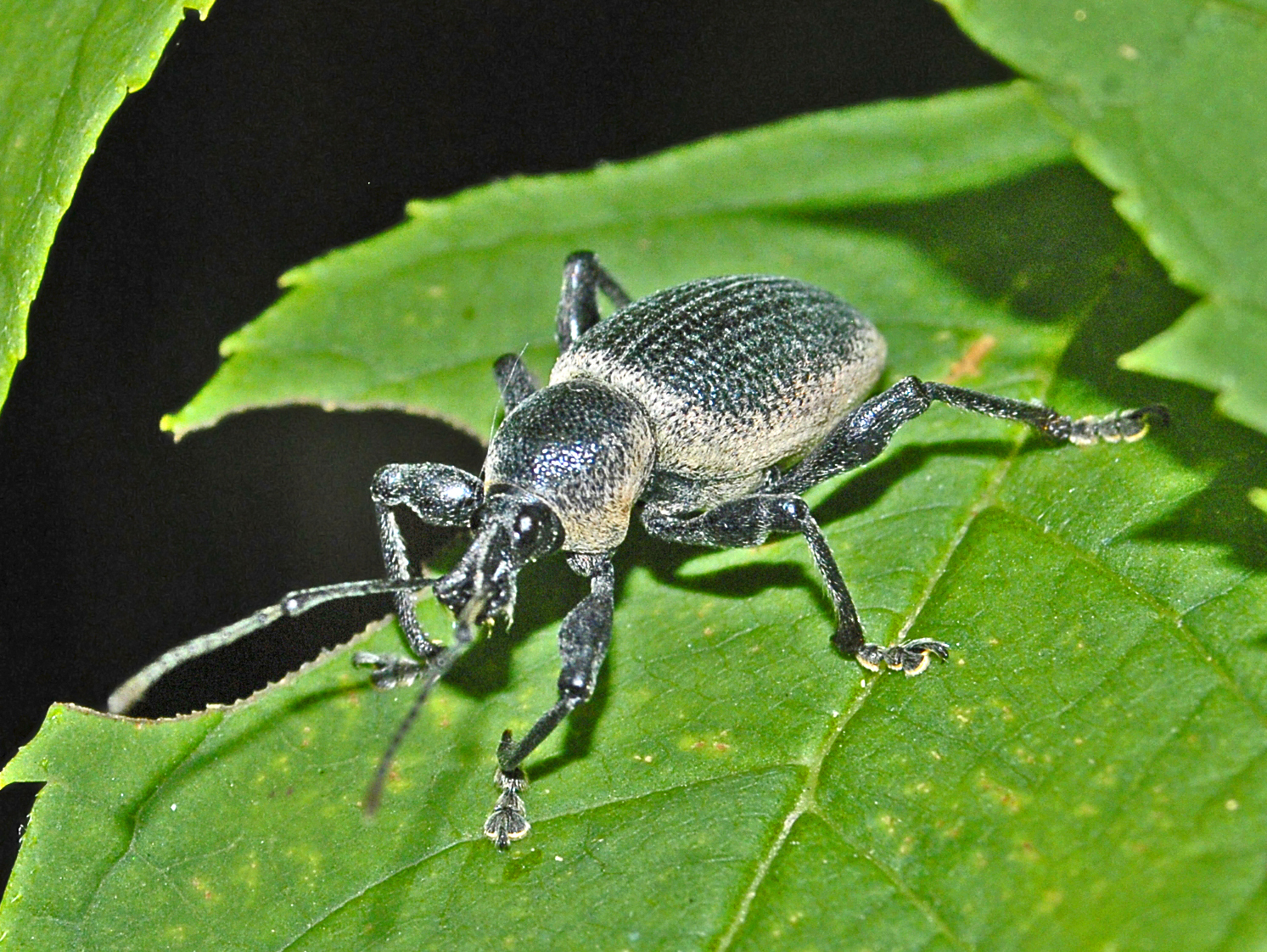
- Otiorhynchus vehemens

Scientific classification
- Kingdom: Animalia
- Phylum: Arthropoda
- Clade: Pancrustacea
- Class: Insecta
- Order: Coleoptera
- Suborder: Polyphaga
- Infraorder: Cucujiformia
- Family: Curculionidae
- Genus: Otiorhynchus
- Species: O. vehemens

Binomial name
- Otiorhynchus vehemens Boheman, 1843

Synonyms
- Otiorhynchus ticinensis Stierlin, 1858

= Otiorhynchus vehemens =

Species of beetle

Otiorhynchus vehemens is a species of broad-nosed weevils belonging to the family Curculionidae, subfamily Entiminae.

== Description ==
The adults grow up to 16–18 millimetres (0.63–0.71 in) long. They are black, with a wide greyish lateral band of fine hairs on the elytra and pronotum and longitudinal grooves on the surface of the elytra. Adults can be encountered from April through October.

== Biology ==
These beetle are polyphagous. The soil-living larvae feed on the roots of many host plants, while the adults feed on leaves and have nocturnal habits.

== Distribution ==
It is present in Italy and Switzerland.

== Habitat ==
This species can be found in forests of silver fir (Abies alba) and beech (Fagus species), at an elevation up to about 2,000 metres (6,600 ft) above sea level.

== Bibliography ==
- Guido PEDRONI Biodiversità dei coleotteri Apionidi e Curculionidi in un settore di alta quota delle Alpi Orobie Occidentali Mus. Civ. Sc. Nat. "E. Caffi" - Bergamo
- F. Cianferoni Gli Invertebrati della Riserva Naturale Integrale di Sasso Fratino
