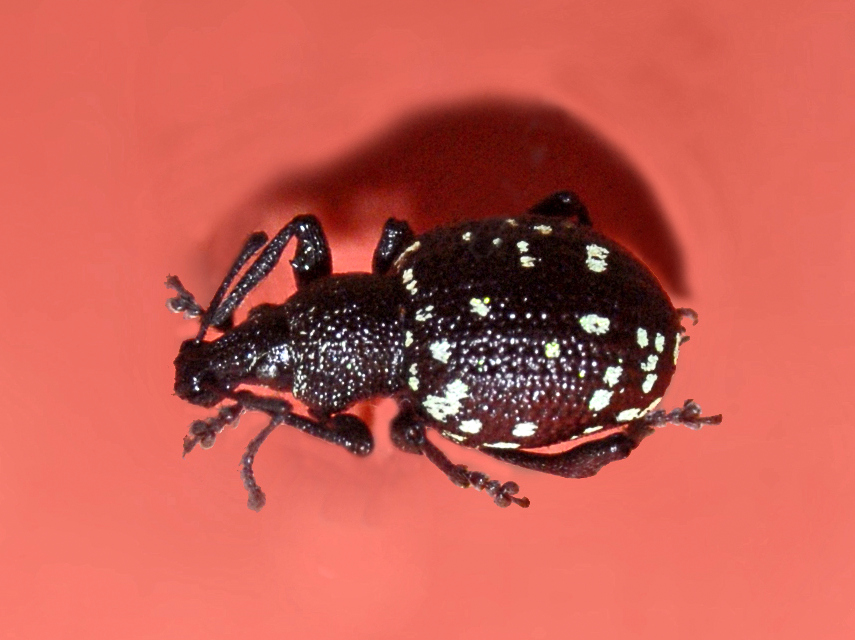
- Museum specimen of Otiorhynchus gemmatus

Scientific classification
- Domain: Eukaryota
- Kingdom: Animalia
- Phylum: Arthropoda
- Class: Insecta
- Order: Coleoptera
- Suborder: Polyphaga
- Infraorder: Cucujiformia
- Family: Curculionidae
- Genus: Otiorhynchus
- Species: O. gemmatus

Binomial name
- Otiorhynchus gemmatus (Scopoli, 1763)

Synonyms
- Dorymerus gemmatus

= Otiorhynchus gemmatus =

Species of beetle

Otiorhynchus gemmatus is a species in the weevil family (Curculionidae).

== Description ==
Otiorhynchus gemmatus can reach a length of 6.5–9 millimetres (0.26–0.35 in). The basic color is black, with small white spots on the elytra.

== Distribution and habitat ==
This species inhabits the mountains of most of Europe.
