= Pachygaster annulipes =

Scientific classification
- Kingdom: Animalia
- Phylum: Arthropoda
- Class: Insecta
- Order: Diptera
- Family: Stratiomyidae
- Subfamily: Pachygastrinae
- Genus: Pachygaster
- Species: P. annulipes

Binomial name
- Pachygaster annulipes Brunetti, 1920

Species of fly

Pachygaster annulipes is a species of soldier fly in the family Stratiomyidae. The distribution is within India.
