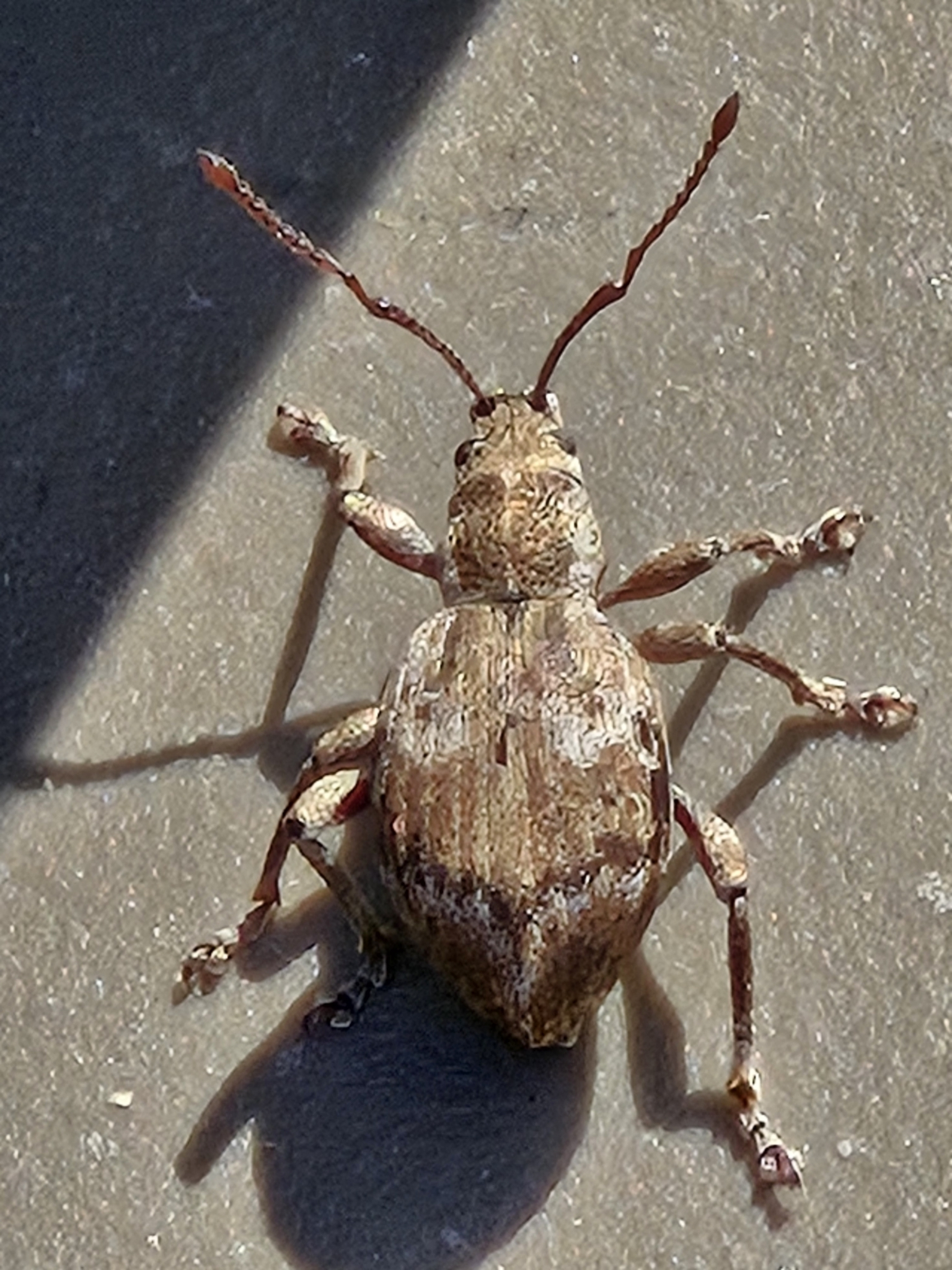
- Obscure root weevil (Sciopithes obscurus)

Scientific classification
- Kingdom: Animalia
- Phylum: Arthropoda
- Class: Insecta
- Order: Coleoptera
- Suborder: Polyphaga
- Infraorder: Cucujiformia
- Family: Curculionidae
- Tribe: Otiorhynchini
- Genus: Sciopithes; Horn, 1876

= Sciopithes =

Genus of beetles

Sciopithes is a genus of broad-nosed weevils in the beetle family Curculionidae. There are about six described species in Sciopithes.

== Species ==
These six species belong to the genus Sciopithes:

- Sciopithes arcuatus Casey, 1888^{i c g}
- Sciopithes insularis Van Dyke, 1935^{i c g}
- Sciopithes intermedius Van Dyke, 1935^{i c g}
- Sciopithes obscurus Horn, 1876^{i c g b} (obscure root weevil)
- Sciopithes setosus Casey, 1888^{i c g}
- Sciopithes sordidus Van Dyke, 1935^{i c g}

Data sources: i = ITIS, c = Catalogue of Life, g = GBIF, b = Bugguide.net
