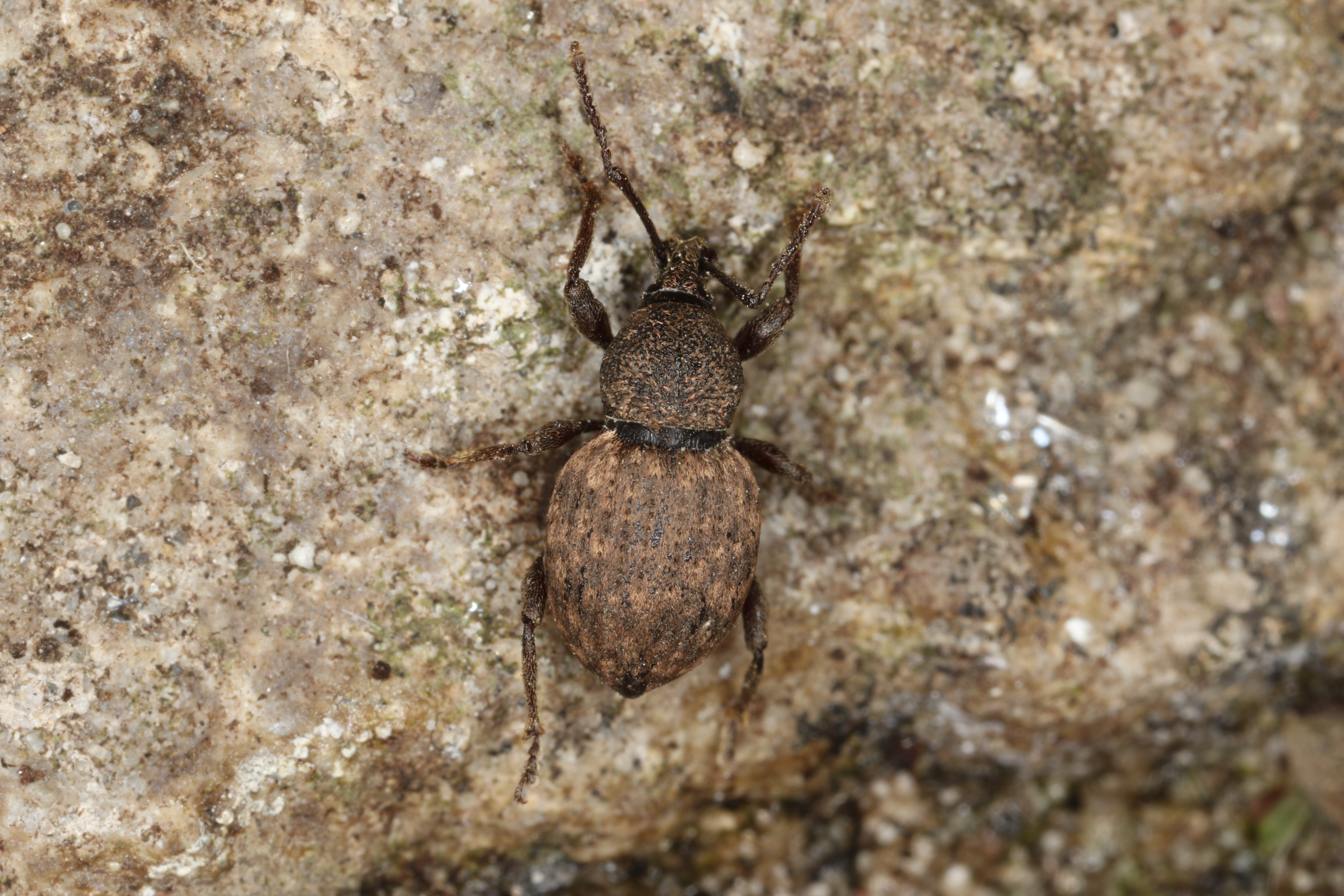

Scientific classification
- Domain: Eukaryota
- Kingdom: Animalia
- Phylum: Arthropoda
- Class: Insecta
- Order: Coleoptera
- Suborder: Polyphaga
- Infraorder: Cucujiformia
- Family: Curculionidae
- Genus: Otiorhynchus
- Species: O. raucus

Binomial name
- Otiorhynchus raucus (Fabricius, 1776)

= Otiorhynchus raucus =

Species of beetle

Otiorhynchus raucus is a species of broad-nosed weevil in the beetle family Curculionidae. It is found in North America.

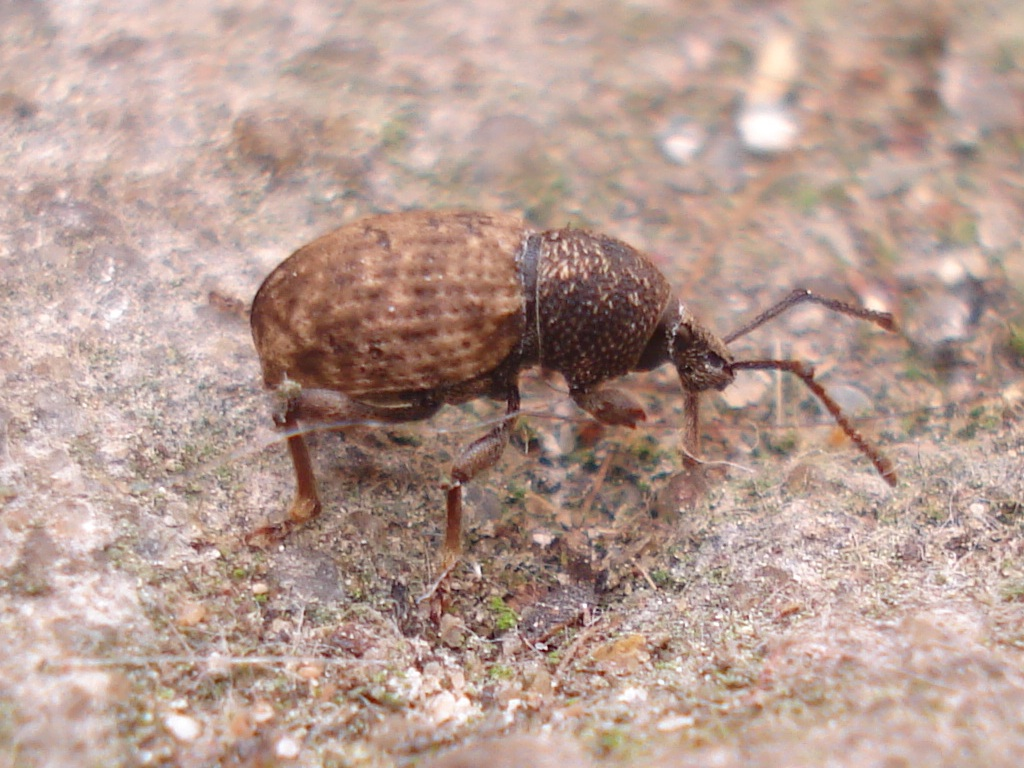

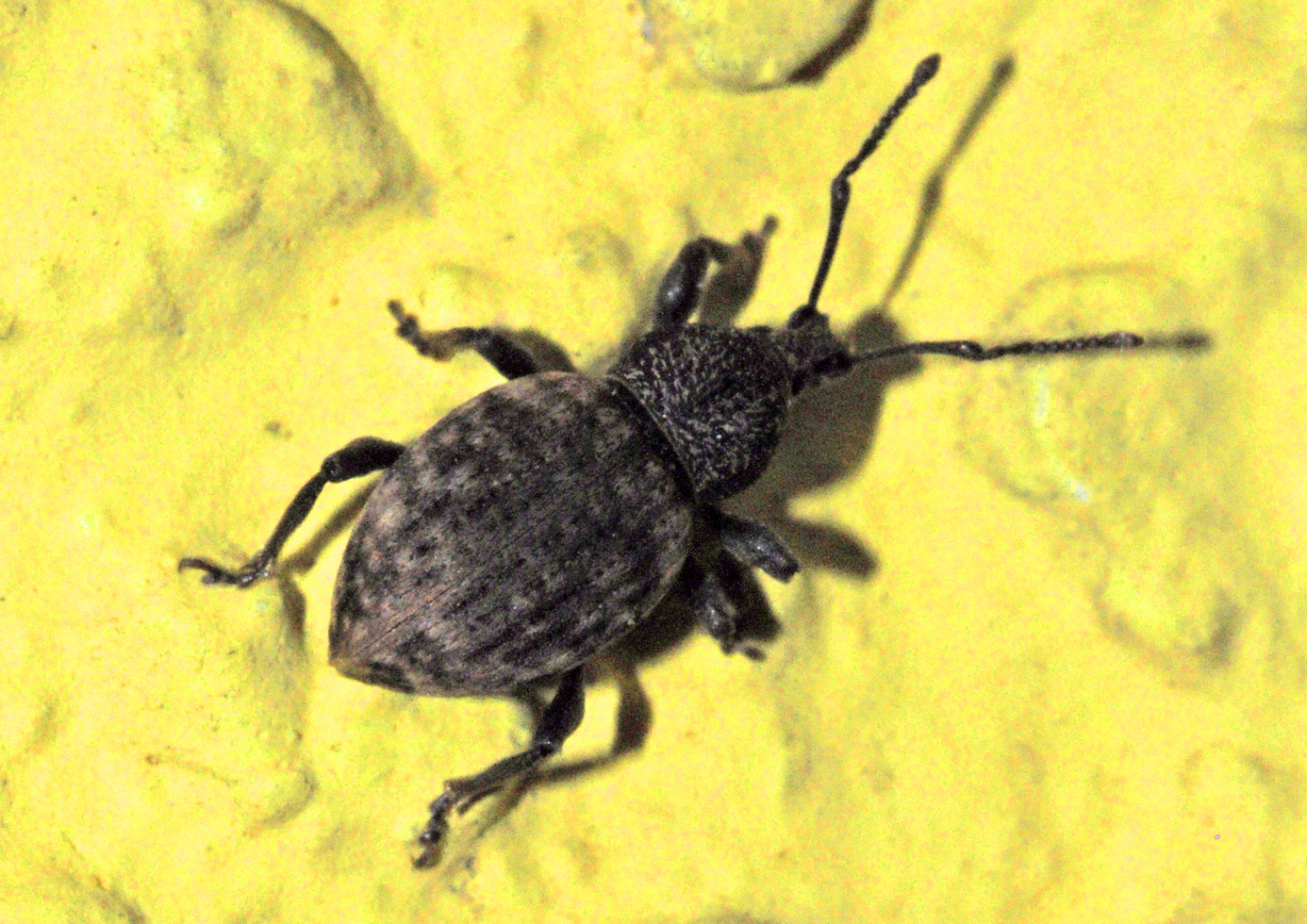
