= Pachygaster characta =

Scientific classification
- Kingdom: Animalia
- Phylum: Arthropoda
- Clade: Pancrustacea
- Class: Insecta
- Order: Diptera
- Family: Stratiomyidae
- Subfamily: Pachygastrinae
- Genus: Pachygaster
- Species: P. characta

Binomial name
- Pachygaster characta Kraft & Cook, 1961

Species of fly

Pachygaster characta is a species of soldier fly in the family Stratiomyidae.

== Distribution ==
Pachygaster characta is found in the United States.
