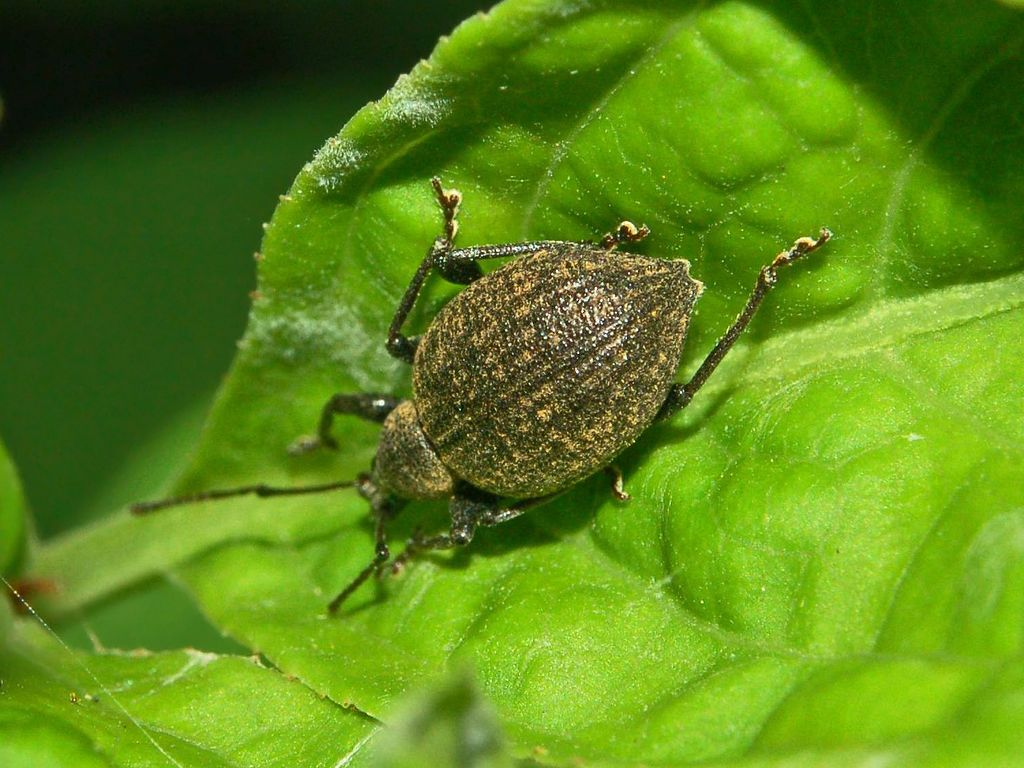
- Otiorhynchus armadillo

Scientific classification
- Domain: Eukaryota
- Kingdom: Animalia
- Phylum: Arthropoda
- Class: Insecta
- Order: Coleoptera
- Suborder: Polyphaga
- Infraorder: Cucujiformia
- Family: Curculionidae
- Subfamily: Entiminae
- Tribe: Otiorhynchini; Schönherr, 1826

Genera
- See text

= Otiorhynchini =

Tribe of beetles

Otiorhynchini is a true weevil tribe in the subfamily Entiminae.

== Genera ==
Agronus - Calyptops - Catergus - Cirrorhynchus - Dodecastichus - Epitimetes - Homodus - Hygrochus - Kocheriana - Lepydnus - Limatogaster - Meiranella - Neotournieria - Otiorhynchus - Parameira - Parotiorhynchus - Pavesiella - Phaeocharis - Pseudocratopus - Rhynchotious - Sciobius - Sciopithes - Tylotus - †Otiorhynchites - †Otiorrhynchites
