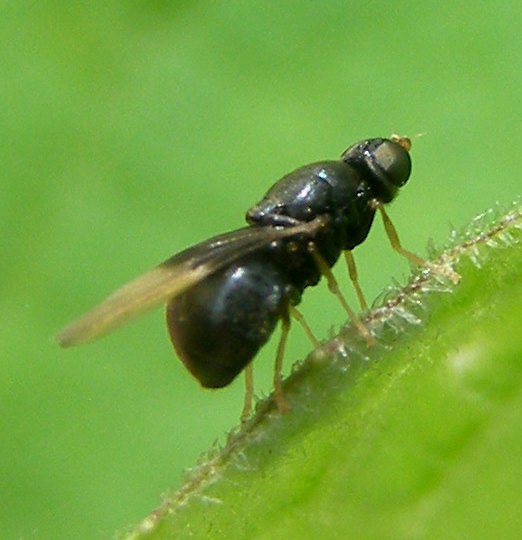

Scientific classification
- Kingdom: Animalia
- Phylum: Arthropoda
- Clade: Pancrustacea
- Class: Insecta
- Order: Diptera
- Family: Stratiomyidae
- Subfamily: Pachygastrinae
- Genus: Pachygaster
- Species: P. atra

Binomial name
- Pachygaster atra (Panzer, 1798)

Synonyms
- Nemotelus ater Panzer, 1798; Sargus pachygaster Fallén, 1817

= Pachygaster atra =

Species of fly

Pachygaster atra, the dark-winged black, is a European species of soldier fly.

== Description ==
A minute (body length 2–3 mm.) lustrous black fly with a round abdomen Body length 2–3 mm. Brilliant black. Eyes black and green. Proboscis brown. Antennae brown (male), red (apical half slightly yellow in female). Halteres brown.

== Biology ==
The habitat is deciduous woodland, on tree leaves, and bark (Linden, pine, alder, poplar), on hedge foliage. Larvae have been found in decomposed elm wood, garden compost heaps, decaying vegetation and leaf litter. The flight period is from June to August.

== Distribution ==
Pachygaster atra is found in Central and Southern European Russia, the Caucasus, and Western Europe.
