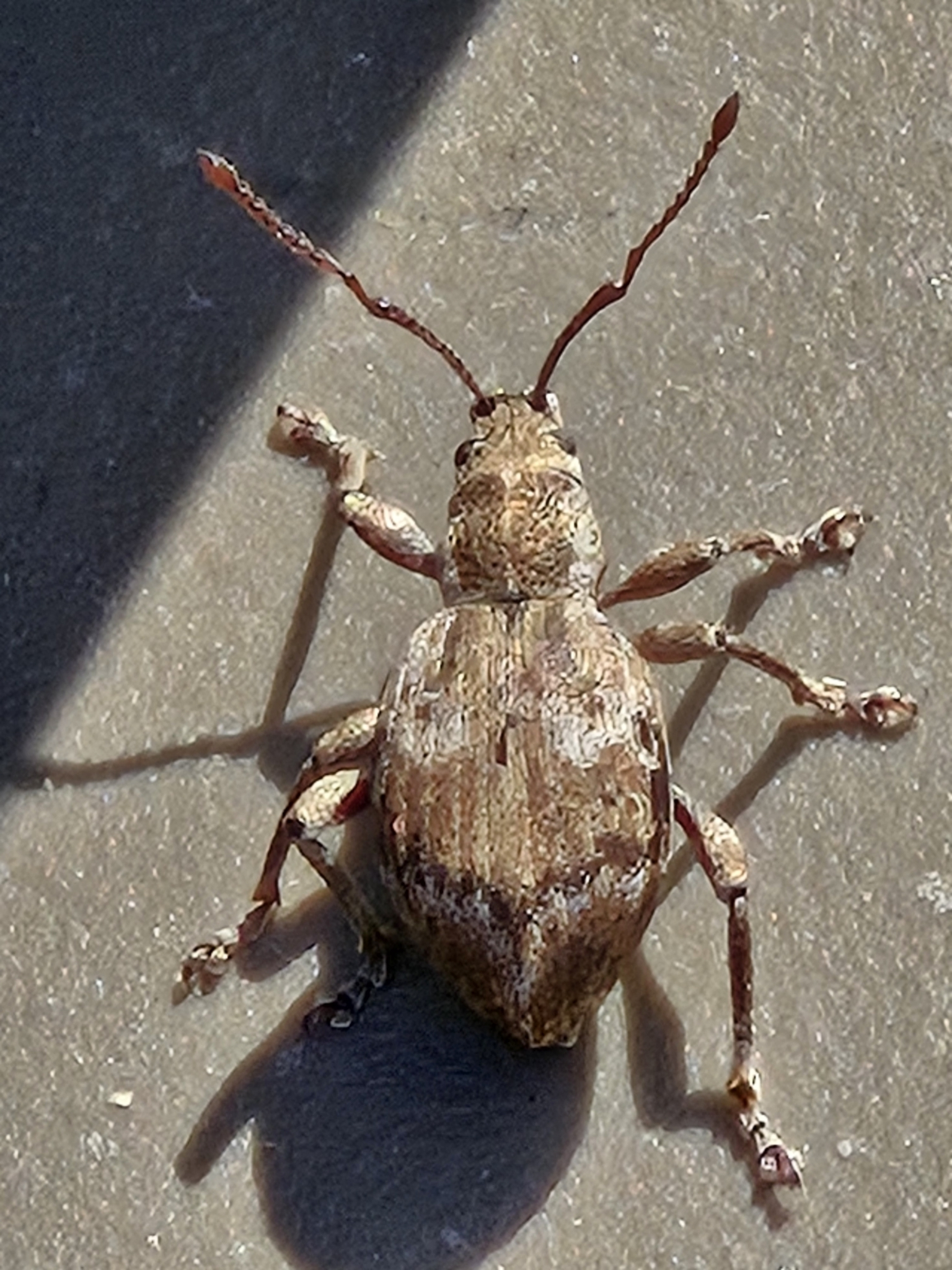

Scientific classification
- Domain: Eukaryota
- Kingdom: Animalia
- Phylum: Arthropoda
- Class: Insecta
- Order: Coleoptera
- Suborder: Polyphaga
- Infraorder: Cucujiformia
- Family: Curculionidae
- Genus: Sciopithes
- Species: S. obscurus

Binomial name
- Sciopithes obscurus Horn, 1876

Synonyms
- Sciopithes angustulus Casey, 1888; Sciopithes brumalis Casey, 1888; Sciopithes significans Casey, 1888

= Sciopithes obscurus =

Obscure root weevil

Species of beetle

Sciopithes obscurus, the Obscure root weevil, is a species of broad-nosed weevil in the beetle family Curculionidae, found in the Pacific Northwest of North America.

== Description ==
They are 6 to 8 millimetres (0.24 to 0.31 in) long, and gray or brown, with a wavy line across their back. They are cylindrical in shape, with a short snout and elbowed antennae near the tip of the snout, in front of the eyes.

== Feeding ==
They are nocturnal, on feed on plant foliage on night. Unlike other species of weevil, they sometimes remain in the foliage during the day, rather than climbing down to the soil. They are considered a pest in the Pacific Northwest, particularly on rhododendrons and strawberries.

== Life cycle ==
Females lay up to a hundred eggs, either in the folds of leaves, or in the soil. There is one generation per year, and upon hatching, the larvae immediately crawl into the soil and begin feeding on roots.
