= Otiorhynchus alpicola =

Scientific classification
- Kingdom: Animalia
- Phylum: Arthropoda
- Clade: Pancrustacea
- Class: Insecta
- Order: Coleoptera
- Suborder: Polyphaga
- Infraorder: Cucujiformia
- Family: Curculionidae
- Genus: Otiorhynchus
- Species: O. alpicola

Binomial name
- Otiorhynchus alpicola Boheman, 1842

Species of beetle

Otiorhynchus alpicola is a species of broad-nosed weevil in the beetle family Curculionidae. It was found for first time in 1843 by Boheman.
