= Agronus carri =

Scientific classification
- Domain: Eukaryota
- Kingdom: Animalia
- Phylum: Arthropoda
- Class: Insecta
- Order: Coleoptera
- Suborder: Polyphaga
- Infraorder: Cucujiformia
- Family: Curculionidae
- Genus: Agronus
- Species: A. carri

Binomial name
- Agronus carri Buchanan, 1929

Species of weevil beetle

Agronus carri is a species of broad-nosed weevil in the beetle family Curculionidae. It is found in North America.
