= Pachygaster montana =

Scientific classification
- Kingdom: Animalia
- Phylum: Arthropoda
- Class: Insecta
- Order: Diptera
- Family: Stratiomyidae
- Subfamily: Pachygastrinae
- Genus: Pachygaster
- Species: P. montana

Binomial name
- Pachygaster montana Kraft & Cook, 1961

Species of fly

Pachygaster montana is a species of soldier fly in the family Stratiomyidae.

== Distribution ==
United States, Mexico.
