= Pachygaster subatra =

Scientific classification
- Kingdom: Animalia
- Phylum: Arthropoda
- Clade: Pancrustacea
- Class: Insecta
- Order: Diptera
- Family: Stratiomyidae
- Subfamily: Pachygastrinae
- Genus: Pachygaster
- Species: P. subatra

Binomial name
- Pachygaster subatra Krivosheina, 2004

Species of fly

Pachygaster subatra is a species of soldier fly in the family Stratiomyidae.

== Distribution ==
Pachygaster subatra is found in Armenia, Georgia, and Russia.
