= Pachygaster pulcher =

Scientific classification
- Kingdom: Animalia
- Phylum: Arthropoda
- Class: Insecta
- Order: Diptera
- Family: Stratiomyidae
- Genus: Pachygaster
- Species: P. pulcher

Binomial name
- Pachygaster pulcher Loew, 1863

Synonyms
- Pachygaster pulcher Loew, 1863

Species of fly

Pachygaster pulcher is a species of soldier fly in the family Stratiomyidae. The range of this species includes the Canadian province of Ontario.
