= Agronus =

Scientific classification
- Kingdom: Animalia
- Phylum: Arthropoda
- Clade: Pancrustacea
- Class: Insecta
- Order: Coleoptera
- Suborder: Polyphaga
- Infraorder: Cucujiformia
- Superfamily: Curculionoidea
- Family: Curculionidae
- Tribe: Otiorhynchini
- Genus: Agronus; Horn, 1876

Genus of beetles

Agronus is a genus of broad-nosed weevils in the beetle family Curculionidae. There are at least three described species in Agronus.

== Species ==
These three species belong to the genus Agronus:

- Agronus carri Buchanan, 1929^{i c g b}
- Agronus cinerarius Horn, 1876^{i c g}
- Agronus deciduus Horn, 1876^{i c g}

Data sources: i = ITIS, c = Catalogue of Life, g = GBIF, b = Bugguide.net
