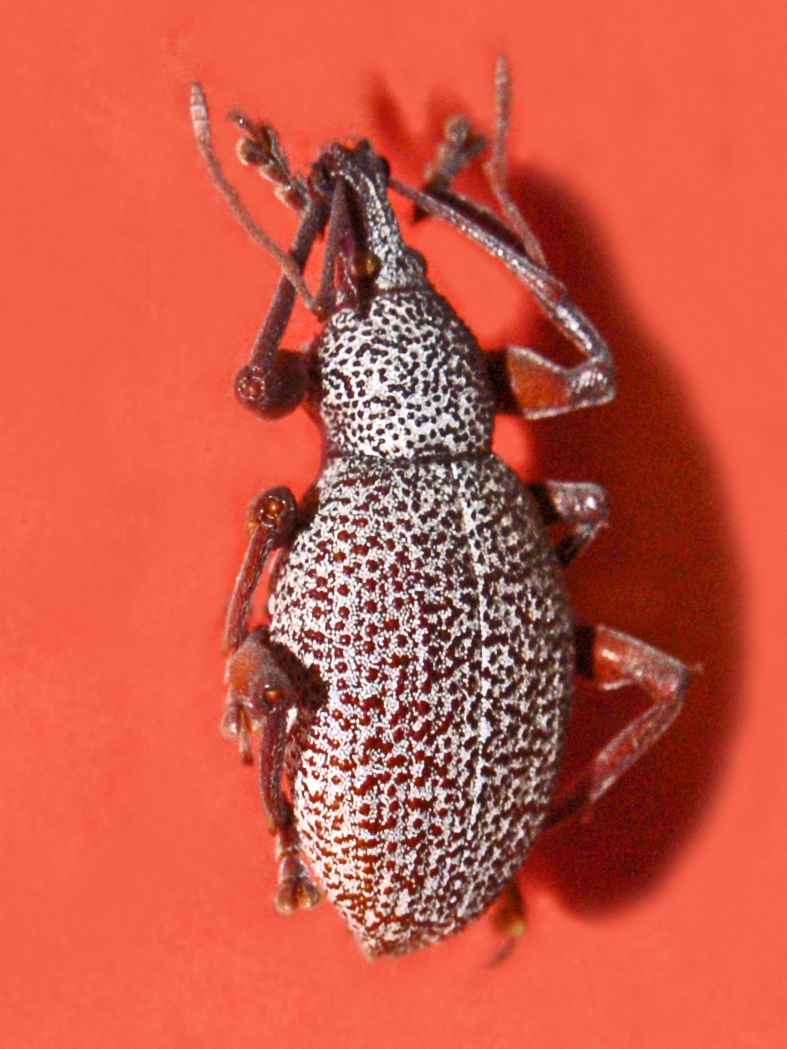
- Museum specimen of Otiorhynchus rhacusensis

Scientific classification
- Kingdom: Animalia
- Phylum: Arthropoda
- Class: Insecta
- Order: Coleoptera
- Suborder: Polyphaga
- Infraorder: Cucujiformia
- Family: Curculionidae
- Genus: Otiorhynchus
- Species: O. rhacusensis

Binomial name
- Otiorhynchus rhacusensis (Germar, 1822)
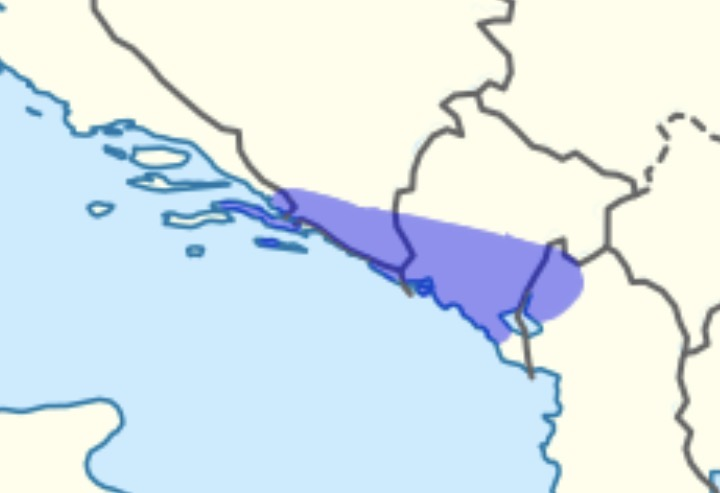

= Otiorhynchus rhacusensis =

Species of beetle

Otiorhynchus rhacusensis is a species in the weevil family (Curculionidae).

== Subspecies ==
- Otiorhynchus rhacusensis rhacusensis (Germar, 1822)
- Otiorhynchus rhacusensis siculus Stierlin, 1861

== Description ==
Otiorhynchus rhacusensis can reach a length of about 15 mm. The basic color of the body is whitish, with flat reddish granules on the pronotum and elytrae and reddish femurs.

== Distribution ==
This species is present in Bosnia and Herzegovina, Croatia, Montenegro and Albania.
