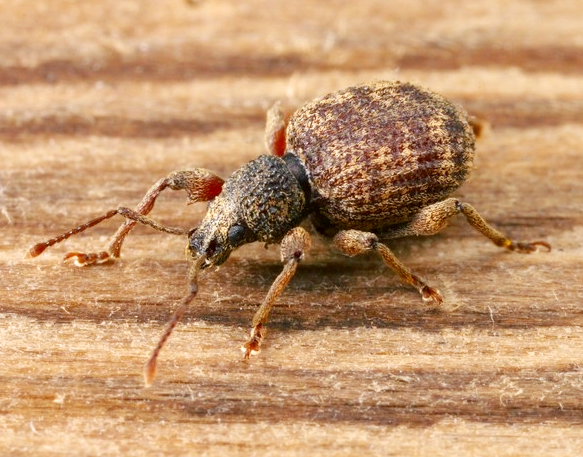

Scientific classification
- Domain: Eukaryota
- Kingdom: Animalia
- Phylum: Arthropoda
- Class: Insecta
- Order: Coleoptera
- Suborder: Polyphaga
- Infraorder: Cucujiformia
- Family: Curculionidae
- Genus: Otiorhynchus
- Species: O. crataegi

Binomial name
- Otiorhynchus crataegi Germar, 1823

= Otiorhynchus crataegi =

Species of beetle

Otiorhynchus crataegi, the privet weevil, is a species of broad-nosed weevil in the beetle family Curculionidae.

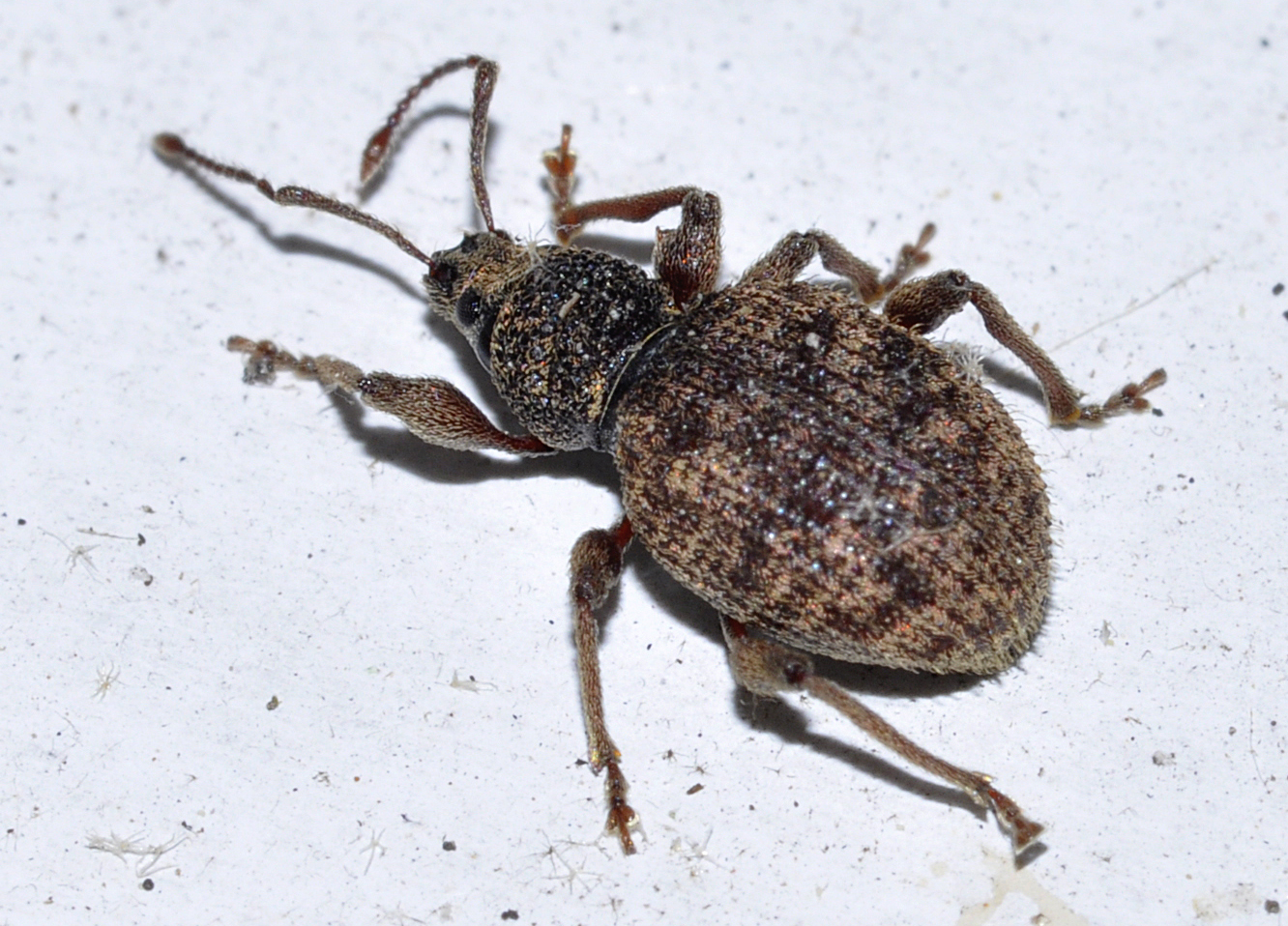
Privet weevil, Otiorhynchus crataegi

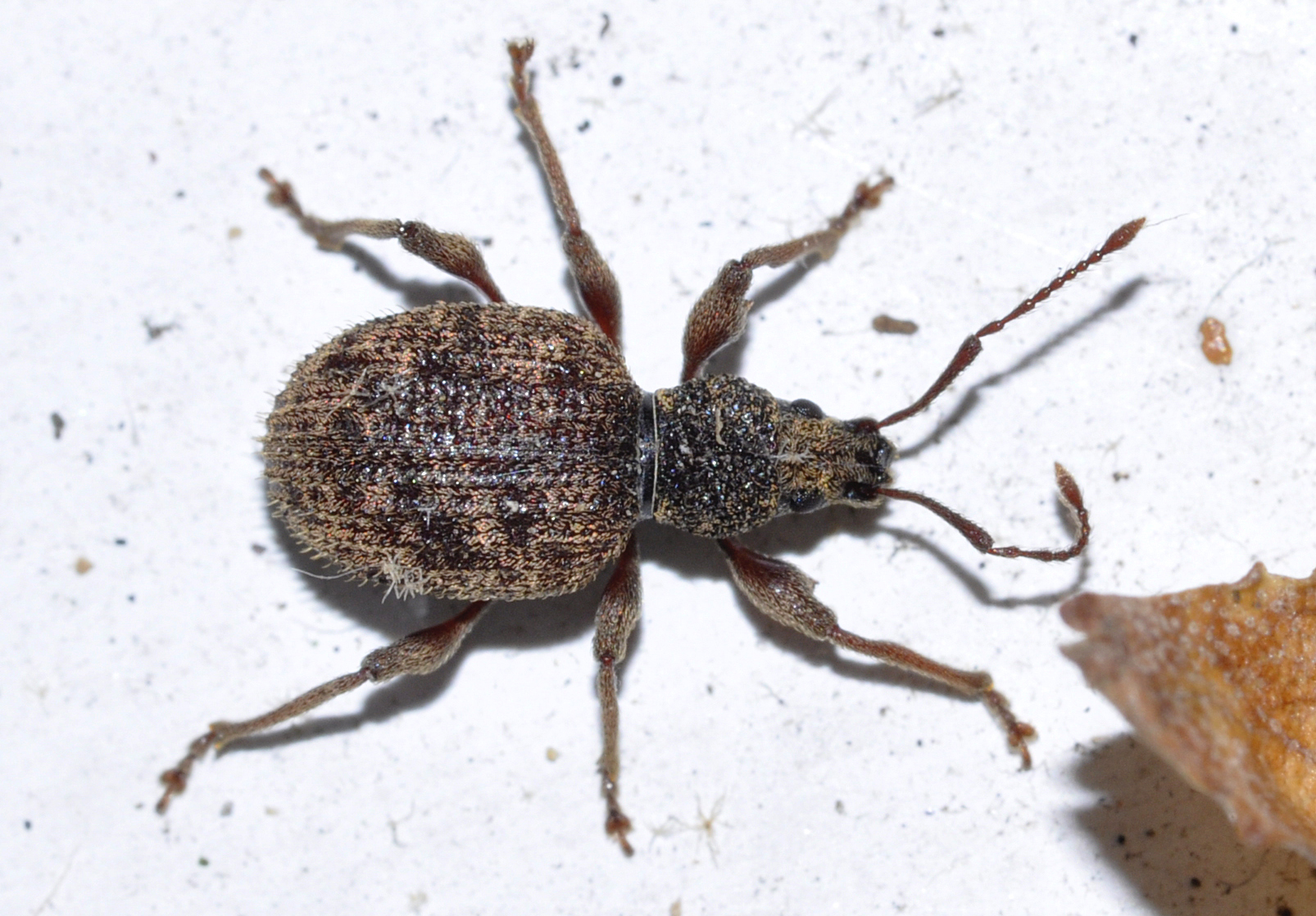
Privet weevil, Otiorhynchus crataegi
