= Otiorhynchus arcticus =

Scientific classification
- Kingdom: Animalia
- Phylum: Arthropoda
- Clade: Pancrustacea
- Class: Insecta
- Order: Coleoptera
- Suborder: Polyphaga
- Infraorder: Cucujiformia
- Family: Curculionidae
- Genus: Otiorhynchus
- Species: O. arcticus

Binomial name
- Otiorhynchus arcticus ( Fabricius, 1780)

Species of beetle

Otiorhynchus arcticus is a species of broad-nosed weevil in the beetle family Curculionidae. It was described to science in 1780 by Johan Christian Fabricius.
