= Pachygaster dorsalis =

Scientific classification
- Kingdom: Animalia
- Phylum: Arthropoda
- Class: Insecta
- Order: Diptera
- Family: Stratiomyidae
- Subfamily: Pachygastrinae
- Genus: Pachygaster
- Species: P. dorsalis

Binomial name
- Pachygaster dorsalis Lindner, 1957

Species of fly

Pachygaster dorsalis is a species of soldier fly in the family Stratiomyidae.

The species is distributed in Western New Guinea.
