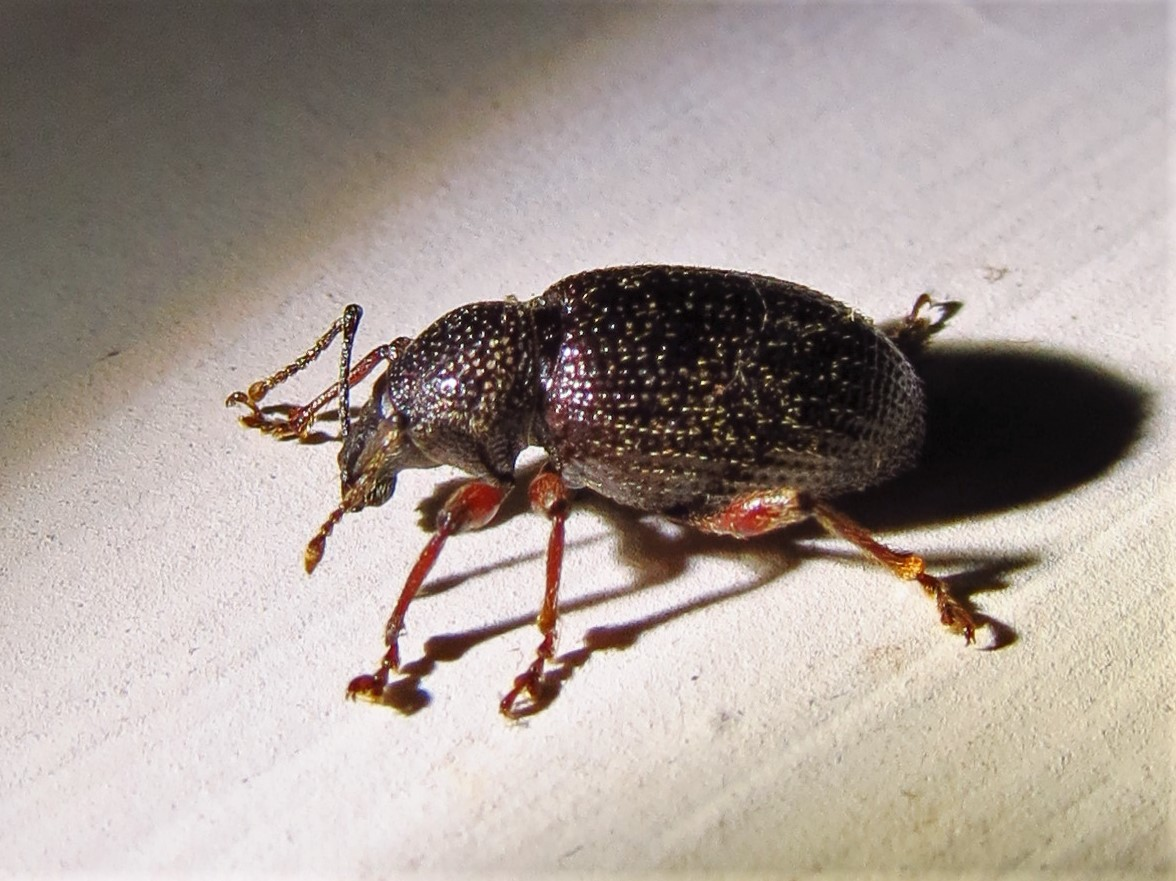

Scientific classification
- Kingdom: Animalia
- Phylum: Arthropoda
- Clade: Pancrustacea
- Class: Insecta
- Order: Coleoptera
- Suborder: Polyphaga
- Infraorder: Cucujiformia
- Superfamily: Curculionoidea
- Family: Curculionidae
- Genus: Otiorhynchus
- Species: O. cribricollis

Binomial name
- Otiorhynchus cribricollis Gyllenhal, 1834

= Otiorhynchus cribricollis =

Species of beetle

Otiorhynchus cribricollis, also known as the cribrate weevil, is one of the many species in the weevil family (Curculionidae). Native to the Mediterranean, it has been reported as a pest of apple orchards and vineyards in Western Australia and recorded as a parasite in Canada.

== Life history ==
Adults reproduce parthenogenically and all are females. Adults are also flightless.
