= Otiorhynchus porcatus =

Scientific classification
- Kingdom: Animalia
- Phylum: Arthropoda
- Class: Insecta
- Order: Coleoptera
- Suborder: Polyphaga
- Infraorder: Cucujiformia
- Family: Curculionidae
- Genus: Otiorhynchus
- Species: O. porcatus

Binomial name
- Otiorhynchus porcatus (Herbst, 1795)

Species of beetle

Otiorhynchus porcatus is a species of broad-nosed weevil in the beetle family Curculionidae. It is found in North America.
