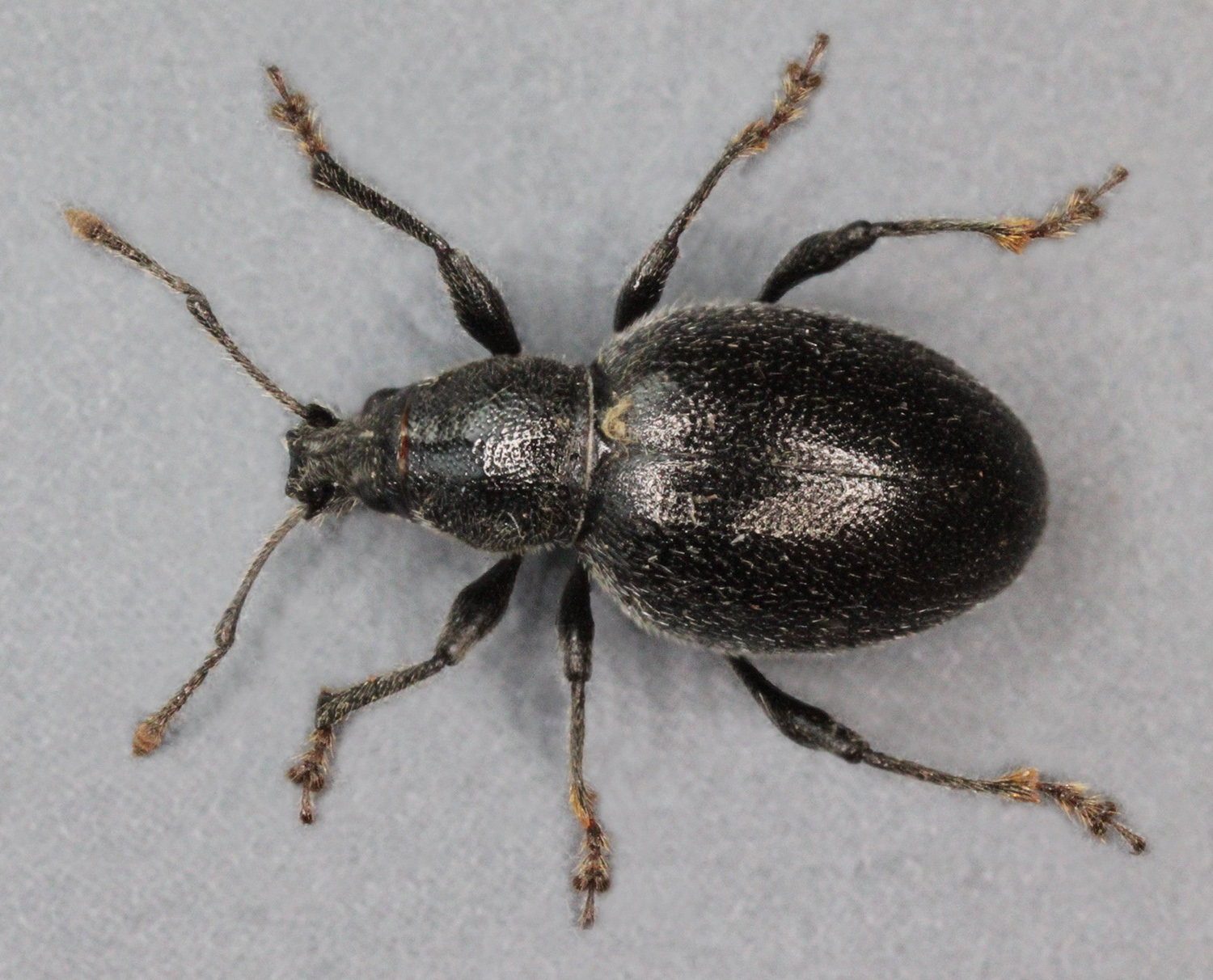
- Otiorhynchus atroapterus

Scientific classification
- Domain: Eukaryota
- Kingdom: Animalia
- Phylum: Arthropoda
- Class: Insecta
- Order: Coleoptera
- Suborder: Polyphaga
- Infraorder: Cucujiformia
- Family: Curculionidae
- Genus: Otiorhynchus
- Species: O. atroapterus

Binomial name
- Otiorhynchus atroapterus (DeGeer, 1775)

= Otiorhynchus atroapterus =

Species of beetle

Otiorhynchus atroapterus is a species of weevil native to Europe.
