= Pachygaster flavimanus =

Scientific classification
- Kingdom: Animalia
- Phylum: Arthropoda
- Clade: Pancrustacea
- Class: Insecta
- Order: Diptera
- Family: Stratiomyidae
- Subfamily: Pachygastrinae
- Genus: Pachygaster
- Species: P. flavimanus

Binomial name
- Pachygaster flavimanus Lindner, 1957

Species of fly

Pachygaster flavimanus is a species of soldier fly in the family Stratiomyidae.

== Distribution ==
Pachygaster flavimanus is found in Western New Guinea.
