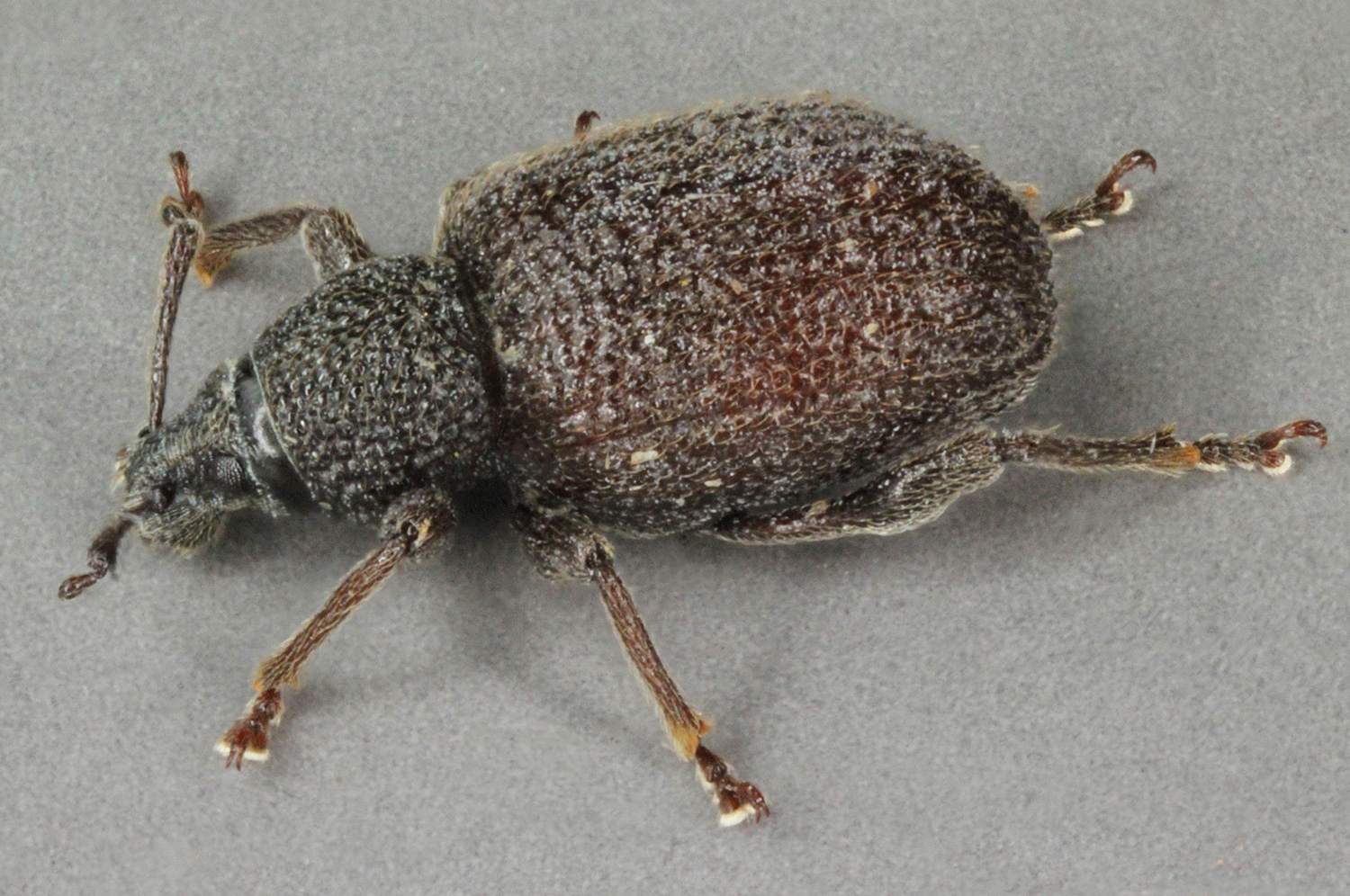

Scientific classification
- Kingdom: Animalia
- Phylum: Arthropoda
- Clade: Pancrustacea
- Class: Insecta
- Order: Coleoptera
- Suborder: Polyphaga
- Infraorder: Cucujiformia
- Superfamily: Curculionoidea
- Family: Curculionidae
- Genus: Otiorhynchus
- Species: O. rugosostriatus

Binomial name
- Otiorhynchus rugosostriatus (Goeze, 1777)

= Otiorhynchus rugosostriatus =

Species of beetle

Otiorhynchus rugosostriatus, known generally as the rough strawberry root weevil or rough strawberry weevil, is a species of broad-nosed weevil in the beetle family Curculionidae. It is found in North America.
