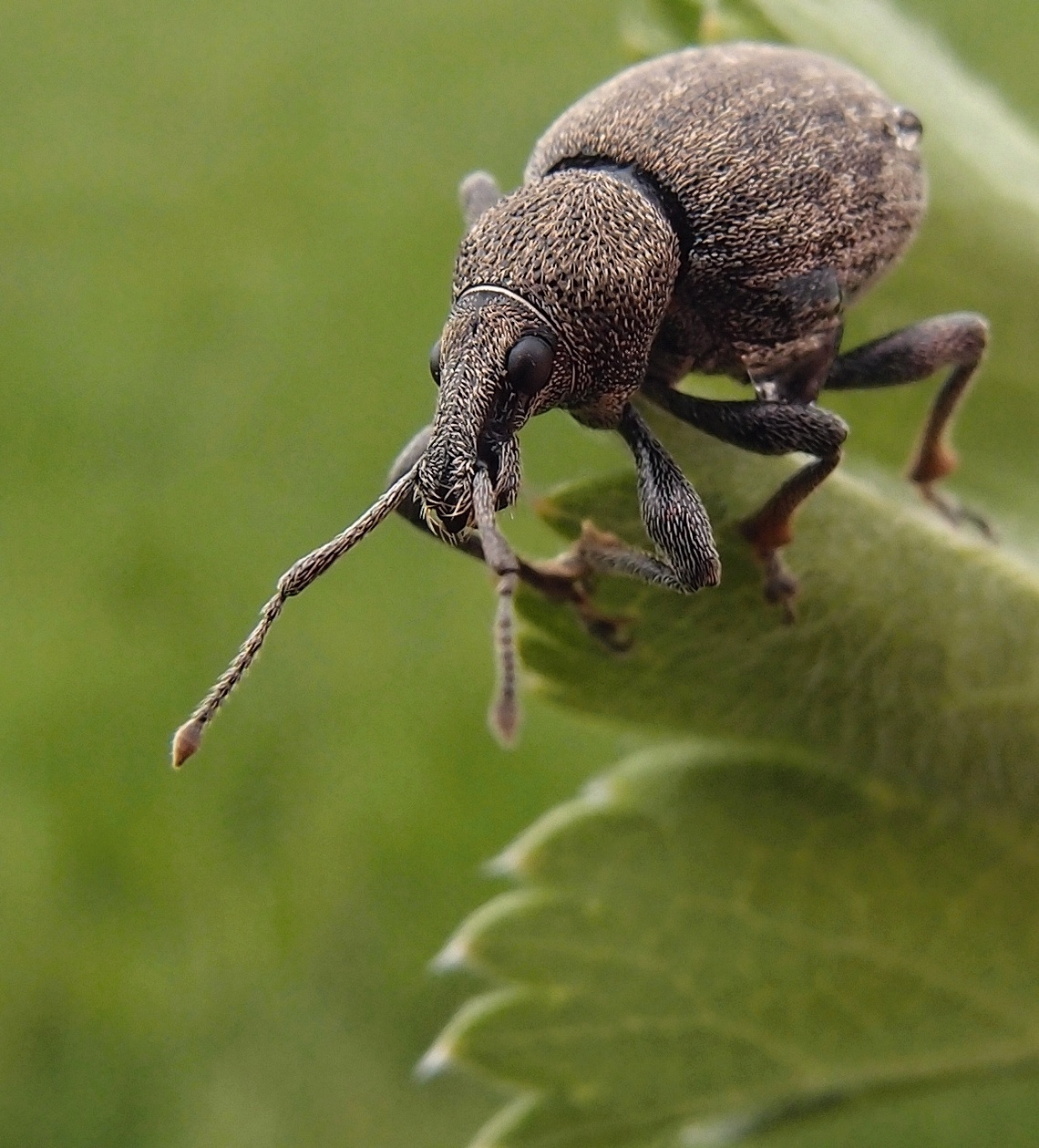

Scientific classification
- Kingdom: Animalia
- Phylum: Arthropoda
- Class: Insecta
- Order: Coleoptera
- Suborder: Polyphaga
- Infraorder: Cucujiformia
- Family: Curculionidae
- Genus: Otiorhynchus
- Species: O. ligustici

Binomial name
- Otiorhynchus ligustici (Linnaeus, 1758)

= Otiorhynchus ligustici =

Species of beetle

Otiorhynchus ligustici, known generally as the alfalfa snout beetle or lovage weevil, is a species of broad-nosed weevil in the family Curculionidae. It is found in North America and Europe.

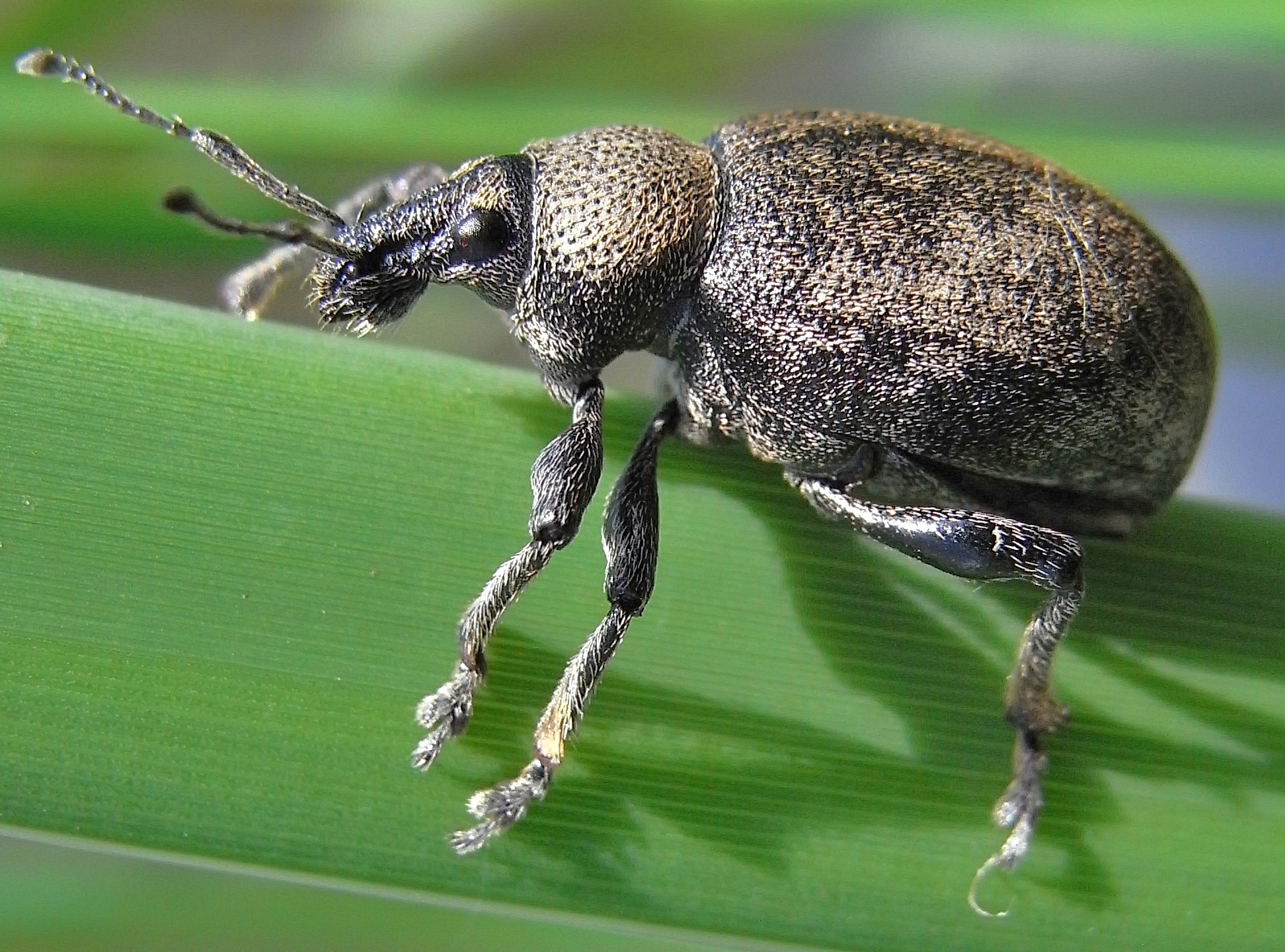
Alfalfa snout beetle, Otiorhynchus ligustici

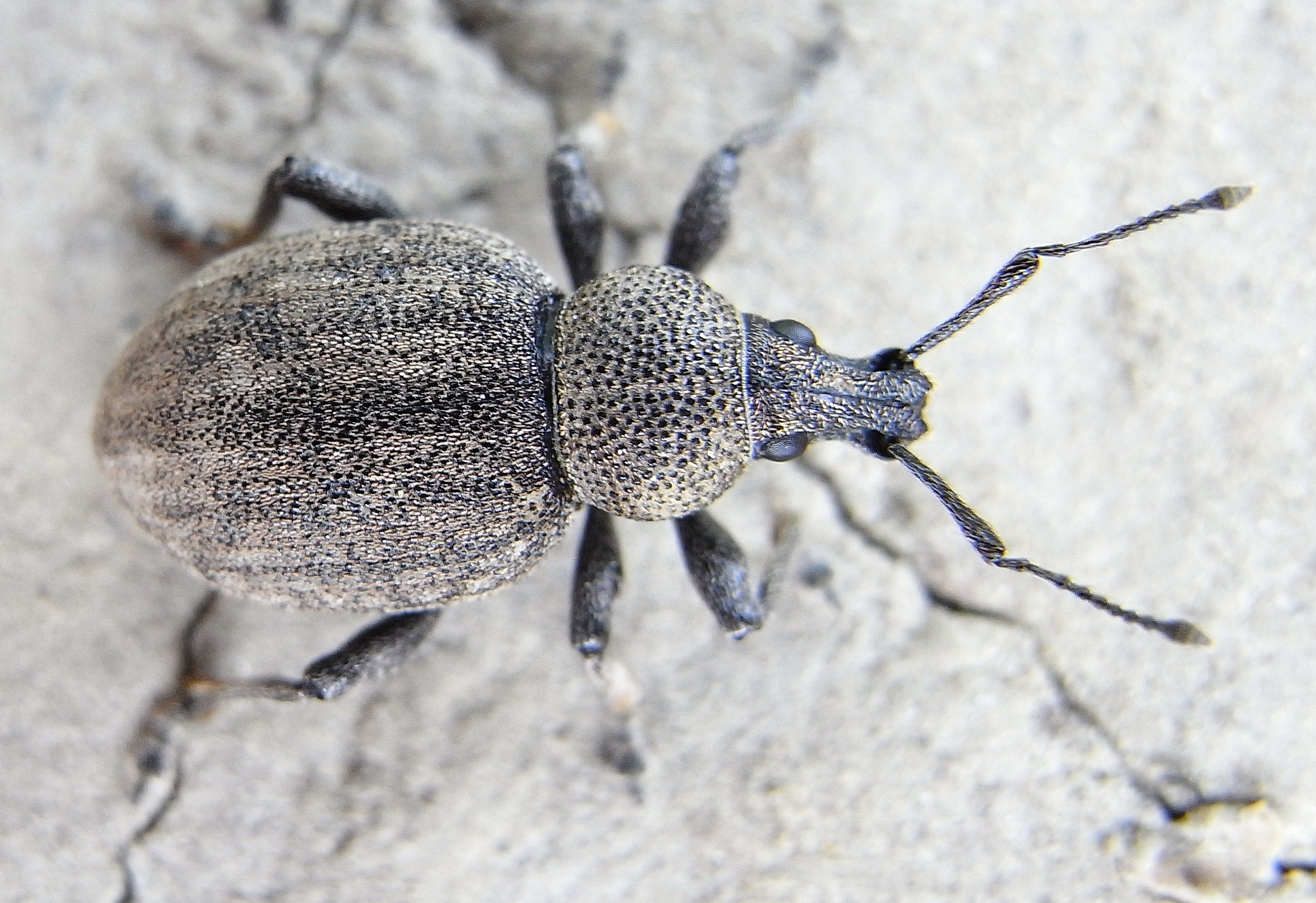
Alfalfa snout beetle, Otiorhynchus ligustici
