= Pachygaster flavipennis =

Scientific classification
- Kingdom: Animalia
- Phylum: Arthropoda
- Clade: Pancrustacea
- Class: Insecta
- Order: Diptera
- Family: Stratiomyidae
- Subfamily: Pachygastrinae
- Genus: Pachygaster
- Species: P. flavipennis

Binomial name
- Pachygaster flavipennis Hull, 1942

Species of fly

Pachygaster flavipennis is a species of soldier fly in the family Stratiomyidae.

== Distribution ==
This species is found in Honduras.
