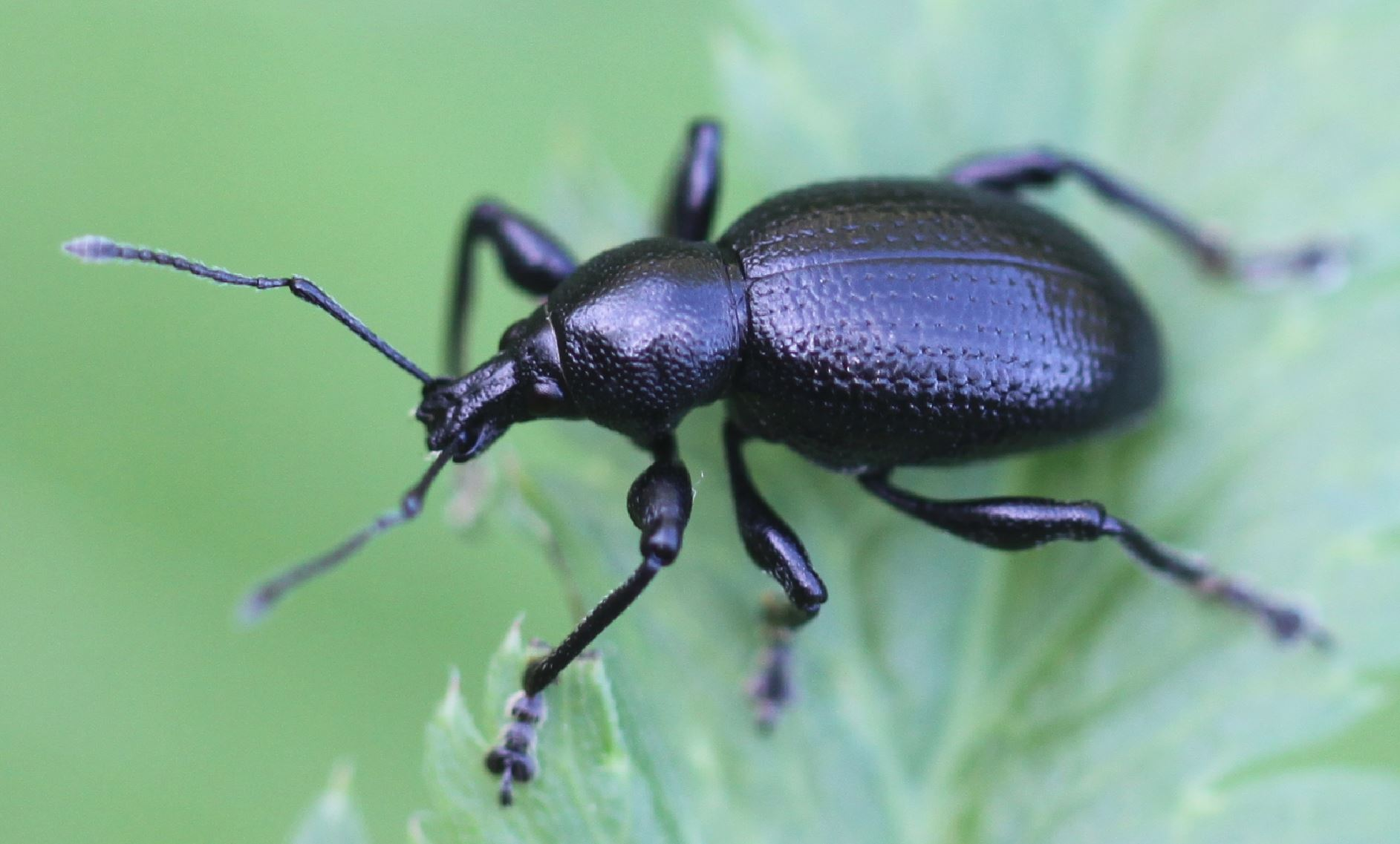

Scientific classification
- Domain: Eukaryota
- Kingdom: Animalia
- Phylum: Arthropoda
- Class: Insecta
- Order: Coleoptera
- Suborder: Polyphaga
- Infraorder: Cucujiformia
- Family: Curculionidae
- Genus: Otiorhynchus
- Species: O. morio

Binomial name
- Otiorhynchus morio Germar, 1824

= Otiorhynchus morio =

Species of beetle

Otiorhynchus morio is one of the many species in the weevil family (Curculionidae). It was first described by German entomologist Ernst Friedrich Germar in 1824.
