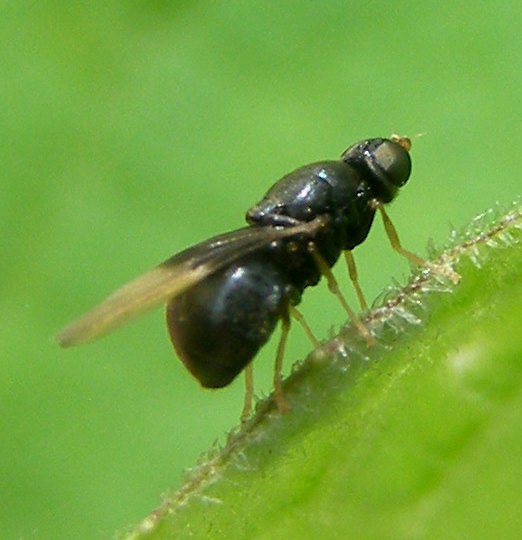
- Female Pachygaster atra

Scientific classification
- Kingdom: Animalia
- Phylum: Arthropoda
- Clade: Pancrustacea
- Class: Insecta
- Order: Diptera
- Family: Stratiomyidae
- Subfamily: Pachygastrinae
- Genus: Pachygaster; Meigen, 1803

Type species
- Pachygaster atra Panzer, 1797

Synonyms
- Vappo Latreille, 1804; Pachigaster Róndani, 1856; Praomyia Kertész, 1916; Alphapachygaster Pleske, 1922; Alphapachygaster Pleske, 1924

= Pachygaster =

Genus of flies

Pachygaster is a genus of flies in the family Stratiomyidae.

Pachygaster differ from other Pachygastrinae morphologically in that their wings have separate R4 and R5 radial veins, their scutellum lacks a distinct posterior rim, and the hairs on the sides of their mesonotum are not flattened.

== Species ==
- Pachygaster annulipes Brunetti, 1920
- Pachygaster antiquus James, 1971
- Pachygaster atra (Panzer, 1797)
- Pachygaster characta Kraft & Cook, 1961
- Pachygaster dorsalis Lindner, 1957
- Pachygaster emerita Krivosheina & Freidberg, 2004
- Pachygaster flavimanus Lindner, 1957
- Pachygaster flavipennis Hull, 1942
- Pachygaster hymenaea Grund & Hauser, 2005
- Pachygaster kerteszi Szilády, 1941
- Pachygaster leachii Curtis, 1824
- Pachygaster maura Lindner, 1939
- Pachygaster montana Kraft & Cook, 1961
- Pachygaster piriventris Rozkošný & Kovac, 1998
- Pachygaster pulcher Loew, 1863
- Pachygaster subatra Krivosheina, 2004
- Pachygaster wirthi James, 1967
