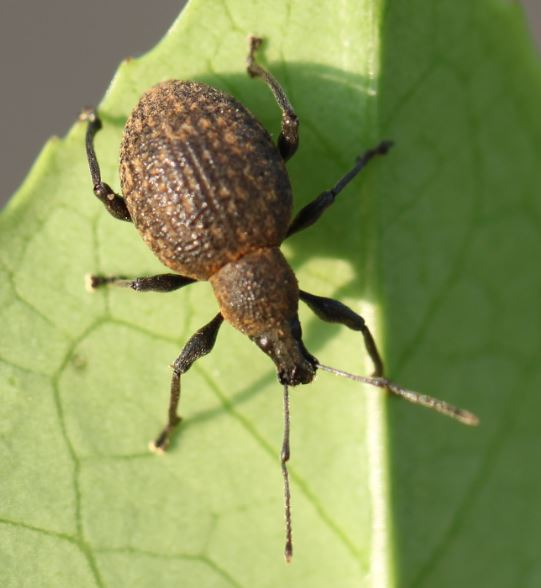

Scientific classification
- Domain: Eukaryota
- Kingdom: Animalia
- Phylum: Arthropoda
- Class: Insecta
- Order: Coleoptera
- Suborder: Polyphaga
- Infraorder: Cucujiformia
- Family: Curculionidae
- Genus: Otiorhynchus
- Species: O. armadillo

Binomial name
- Otiorhynchus armadillo (Rossi, 1792)

Synonyms
- Curculio armadillo Rossi, 1792; Curculio nigrita Rossi, 1790; Curculio sulphurifer Herbst, 1797; Otiorhynchus collinus Gredler, 1863; Otiorhynchus latipennis Stierlin, 1861; Otiorhynchus latissimus Stierlin, 1861; Otiorhynchus rhaeticus Stierlin, 1862; Otiorhynchus scabripennis Gyllenhal, 1834; Otiorhynchus ventricola Weise, 1894

= Otiorhynchus armadillo =

Species of weevil

Otiorhynchus armadillo is a species of broad-nosed weevil belonging to the family Curculionidae, subfamily Entiminae.

It is mainly present in Austria, France, Germany, Italy, Great Britain, Romania, Slovenia and Switzerland.

Otiorhynchus armadillo is polyphagous and it is considered a serious pest of horticultural and ornamental plants. The soil-living larvae feed on the roots of many host plants, while the adults feed on leaves.

The adults grow up to 7–12 millimetres (0.28–0.47 in) long. They are black, with longitudinal grooves on the surface of the elytra.

== Subspecies ==
- Otiorhynchus armadillo armadillo (Rossi, 1792)
- Otiorhynchus armadillo obsitus Gyllenhal, 1834
