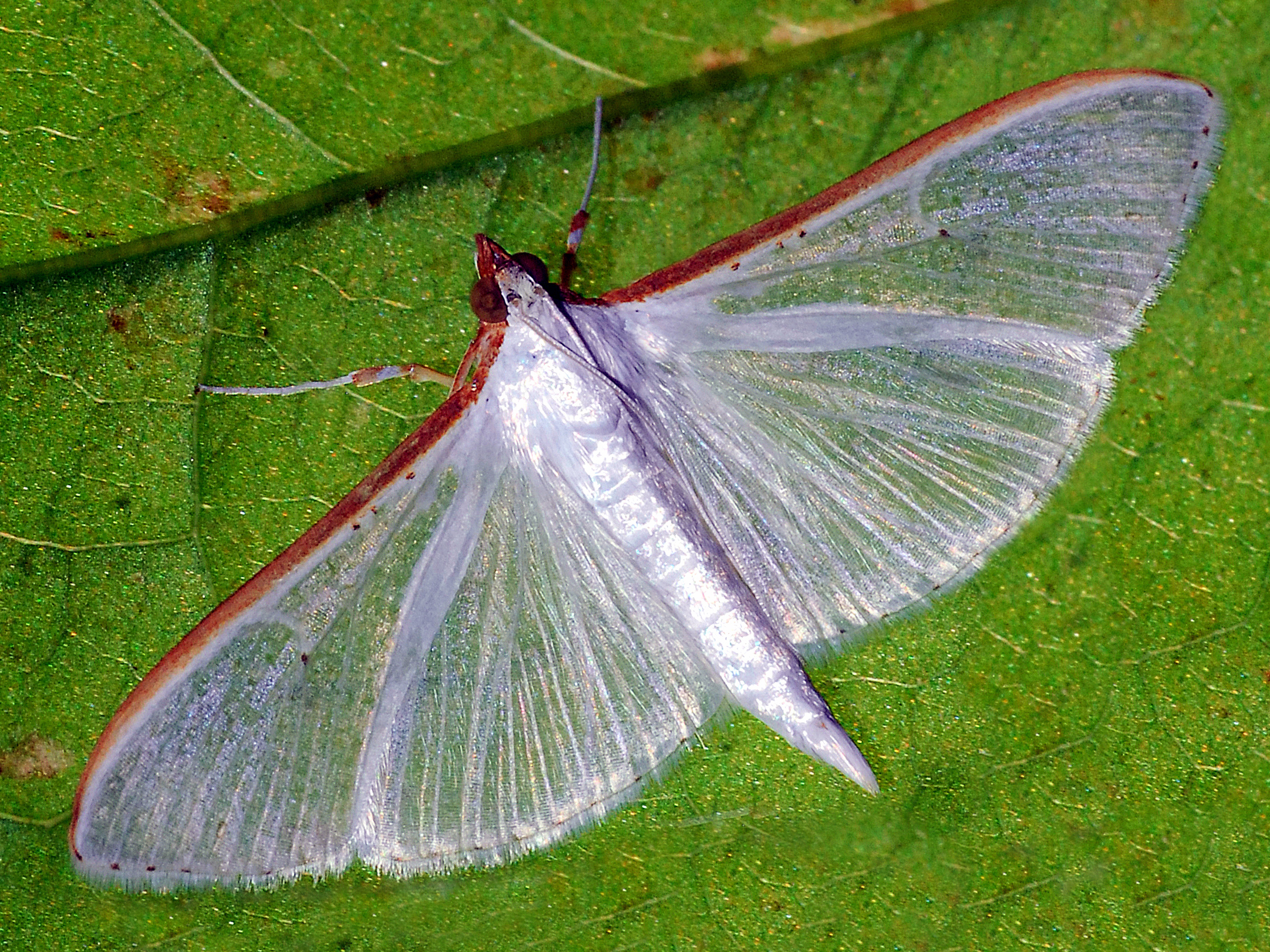
- Moth of Palpita vitrealis

Scientific classification
- Kingdom: Animalia
- Phylum: Arthropoda
- Clade: Pancrustacea
- Class: Insecta
- Order: Lepidoptera
- Family: Crambidae
- Genus: Palpita
- Species: P. vitrealis

Binomial name
- Palpita vitrealis (Rossi, 1794)

Synonyms
- List: Palpita unionalis (Hübner, 1796); Botys jucundalis Lederer, 1863; Botys quinquepunctalis Boisduval, 1833; Margarodes septempunctalis Mabille, 1880; Margarodes transvisalis Guenée, 1854; Orphanostigma versicolor Warren, 1896; Phalaena vitrealis Rossi, 1794; Pyralis unionalis Hübner, 1796; Syngamia latimarginalis (Walker, 1859)

= Palpita vitrealis =

Species of moth

Palpita vitrealis, common name jasmine moth or white pearl, is a species of moth of the family Crambidae.

== Distribution ==
This species occurs worldwide, including Africa (Equatorial Guinea, Gambia, Kenya, Sierra Leone, South Africa),Asia, Australia and Europe. In Europe, it is mainly found in southern Europe, but may be found further north.

== Description ==
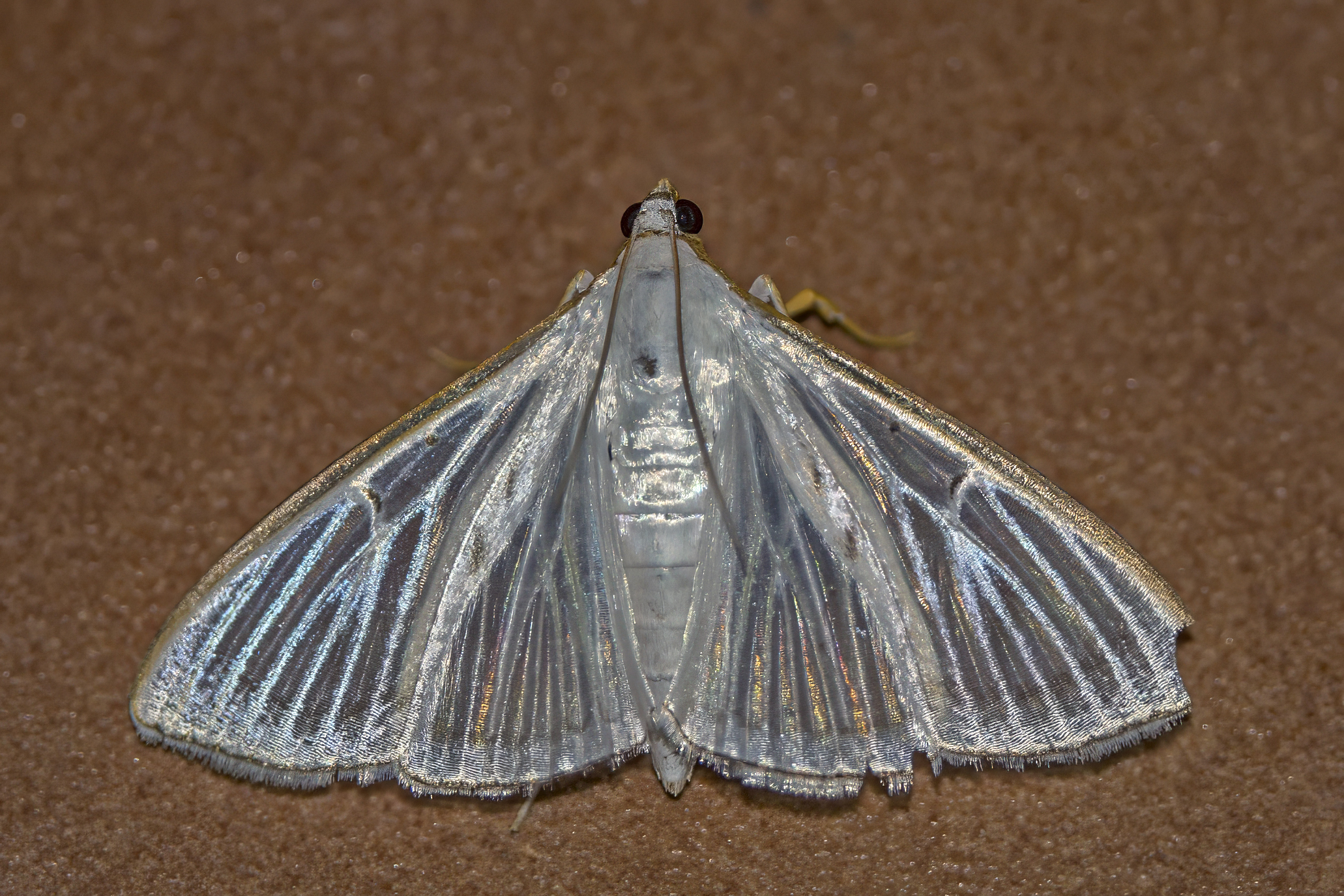
in Ghana

The wingspan of Palpita vitrealis can reach 27–31 mm. The body and the wings are translucent with a slight sheen. Eyes are large and reddish-brown. On the upper edge of the forewings is present a rather broad orange or brown border. The forewings also show two black spots in the middle. Legs are white and brown ringed.

== Biology ==
These moths mainly fly from August till late October, depending on the location. They feed on nectar of various flowers, including ivy and buddleia. This species shows a migratory nature. The larvae are initially yellow, later becoming green. They can grow to a length of about 2 cms. They feed on the leaves of the host plants, mainly jasmine (Jasminum officinale), privet (Ligustrum species), Forsythia, Arbutus unedo and european olive (Olea europaea). In Africa the preferred host plants are Sida rhombifolia, Grewia, Helicteres isora, Schima noronhae and Randia scortechinii. The larvae are considered a pest of olive fields, as they attack the leaves and fruits. The final instar of the larvae spins some leaves together and form a silky cocoon to pupate.
