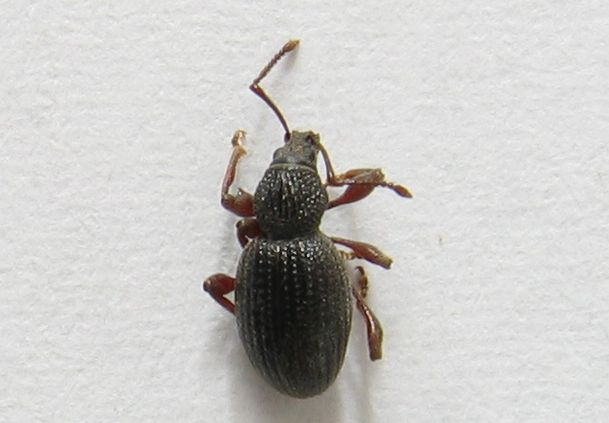

Scientific classification
- Kingdom: Animalia
- Phylum: Arthropoda
- Clade: Pancrustacea
- Class: Insecta
- Order: Coleoptera
- Suborder: Polyphaga
- Infraorder: Cucujiformia
- Superfamily: Curculionoidea
- Family: Curculionidae
- Genus: Otiorhynchus
- Species: O. ovatus

Binomial name
- Otiorhynchus ovatus (Linnaeus, 1758)

= Otiorhynchus ovatus =

Species of beetle

Otiorhynchus ovatus, the strawberry root weevil, is one of the many species in the weevil family (Curculionidae), occurring across Canada and the northern United States. The species was first described by Carl Linnaeus in his landmark 1758 10th edition of Systema Naturae. Its name comes from its affinity for strawberry plants, which form a large part of its diet. They are, however, known to feed on other plants as well. Occasionally the larvae cause serious damage to seedlings and young transplants in plantations and nurseries (Rose and Lindquest 1985). It is known to be one of the major pests threatening sub-tropical strawberry farming.

== Description ==
The adult strawberry root weevil is about six millimeters long, and is dark brown/black in color. They are often found in the leaves and foliage of the plants they feed on. The adult weevil's elytra are fused together, which means they are unable to fly. The larvae can be up to thirteen millimeters long when fully grown and they are found near the roots of the plants they are infesting. The larvae are white, legless, with a darker colored head and are often C-shaped.

The weevil overwinters as a larva deep in the soil, or as an adult under stones or other sheltered places. Larvae feed on roots and can weaken or kill smaller plants. They are whitish, C-shaped, and about 8 mm long when full grown, much smaller than white grubs. They pupate in the upper layers of soil in the spring and change into adults later in the spring or in summer, joining the adults of the previous summer to feed on leaves and fruit.

The adults lack functional wings and do not fly. There are no males, and reproduction is asexual. Eggs are laid at random in the soil in summer around food plants, and, on hatching, the larvae feed on the roots until late fall, when they hibernate.

Strawberry root weevils reproduce through a process called parthenogenesis. This means that female adults can reproduce without the need for a male. In fact, no male specimen has ever been observed in this species.

== Human impact ==
The plants that the strawberry root weevil feeds on include strawberry, raspberry, rhododendron, grape, and peppermint and they have also been known to feed on grasses. Adults feed nocturnally on leaves and stems, leaving notches and causing slight damage, while the larvae cause significantly more damage by feeding on the roots and crowns of the plant, even as they overwinter, if the temperatures are mild.

The plants that are fed upon by the larvae are stunted and have reddish leaves that curl exposing the underside, and the plant wilts as the fruits form, especially in dry weather. The fine roots and sometimes even the hard fibrous roots are destroyed, allowing for the plants to be easily pulled from the soil. These plants have significantly shortened lives, poor yields that result in losses in revenue. Since adults do not fly, plants bordering older plantings show damage the first season, with damage spreading each year the planting is kept. Controlling the strawberry root weevil includes a wide variety of methods such as the use of insecticides, plowing under old crops and crop rotation, cleaning farm equipment before moving to a new field, and fall plowing infested beds or fields. Another control method is the use of entomopathogenic nematodes, though results have varied.
