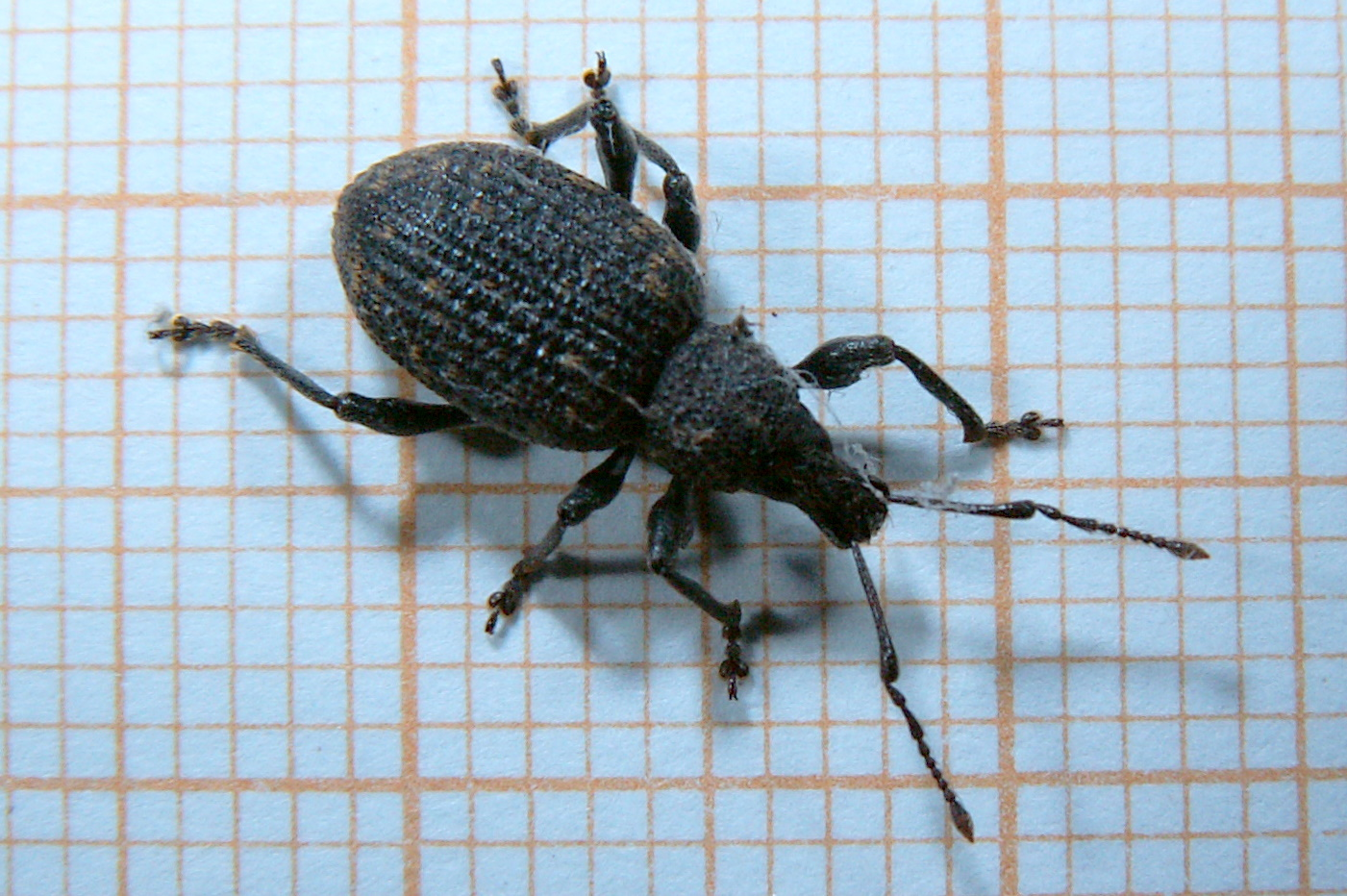
- Otiorhynchus sulcatus on millimeter graph paper

Scientific classification
- Kingdom: Animalia
- Phylum: Arthropoda
- Clade: Pancrustacea
- Class: Insecta
- Order: Coleoptera
- Suborder: Polyphaga
- Infraorder: Cucujiformia
- Superfamily: Curculionoidea
- Family: Curculionidae
- Genus: Otiorhynchus
- Species: O. sulcatus

Binomial name
- Otiorhynchus sulcatus (Fabricius, 1775)

= Vine weevil =

Black vine weevil

Species of beetle

The black vine weevil (Otiorhynchus sulcatus) is an insect native to Europe but common in North America as well. It is a pest of many garden plants.

== Overview ==
The adult weevil is matte black with fused wing covers, and is unable to fly. It feeds at night on the outer edges of leaves, causing the leaves to have a notched margin. Broadleaved evergreen plants such as Camellia, Rhododendron, Euonymus and Bergenia are particularly prone to damage, although a wide range of different garden plants are susceptible to attack.

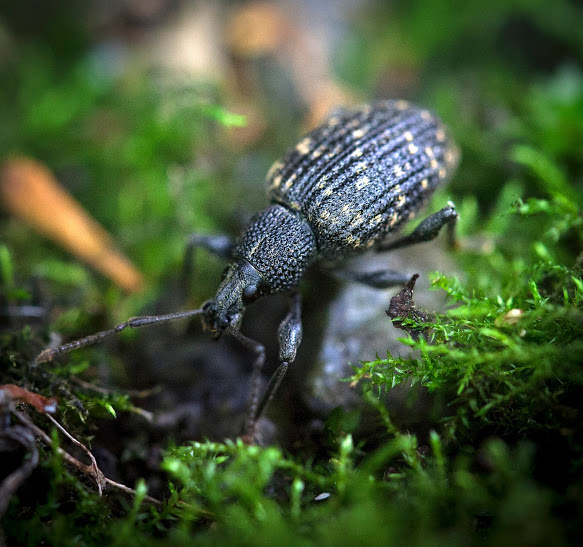

Female weevils have the ability to reproduce parthenogenetically with fertilisation of eggs required to produce males, though no males have been observed. This form of parthenogenesis is known as thelytoky. Grubs grow up to 1 cm in length, have a slightly curved, legless body and are creamy white in colour with a tan-brown head. They live below the soil surface, and feed on roots and cambium at the base of trunks. They mostly cause damage to herbaceous plants, particularly those growing in containers, where root growth is restricted. Severe infestations can result in complete root destruction and hence plant death.

== Host plants ==
Their host plant genera include:

- Arisaema
- Acer
- Aster
- Astilbe
- Bergenia
- Camellia
- Echinacea
- Epimedium
- Euonymus
- Heuchera
- Hosta
- Kalmia
- Lilium
- Phlox
- Primula
- Rhododendron
- Saxifraga
- Sedum
- Syringa
- Taxus
- Tsuga
- Vaccinium
- Wisteria

== Controls ==
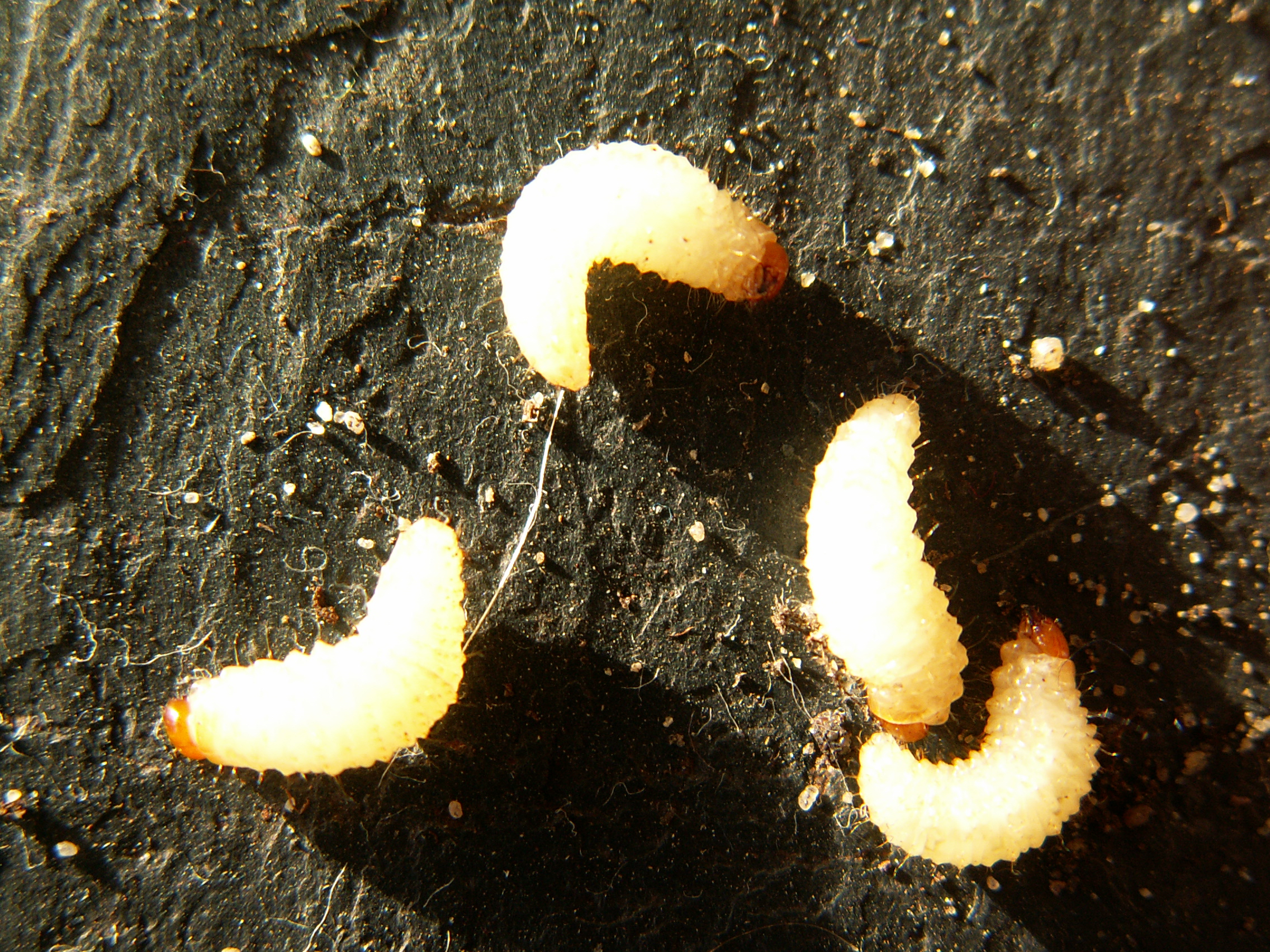
Grubs (larvae)

The soil dwelling grubs can be difficult to control with chemical insecticides, and products showing some efficacy, such as chlorpyrifos, have been withdrawn from many markets, especially garden centres. Besides their environmental benefits, certain 'cruiser' entomopathogenic nematode species (see below) have the additional capacity to search for their prey underground.

Adult weevils can be controlled by using sticky barriers on the trunks of affected plants, as the weevils return to the soil each day.

Adults can also be manually removed from plants at night when they can be found feeding on leaf edges. Use only a dim torch or candlelight to search by, as they will drop to the ground if startled by bright light.

=== Biological controls ===
Larvae can be controlled using parasitic nematodes, for example Steinernema kraussei and Heterorhabditis bacteriophora (a 'cruiser' species), which can be bought from some garden centres and by mail order. They are mixed with water and watered onto the soil.

Adults may also be controlled using products based on the fungi Metarhizium brunneum (formerly Metarhizium anisopliae) and Beauveria bassiana.

== See also ==
- Lixus concavus, the Rhubarb curculio weevil
