= Linnaeus's flower clock =

Garden plan hypothesized by Carl Linnaeus

Linnaeus's flower clock was a garden plan hypothesized by Carl Linnaeus that would take advantage of several plants that open or close their flowers at particular times of the day to accurately indicate the time. According to Linnaeus's autobiographical notes, he discovered and developed the floral clock in 1748. It builds on the fact that there are species of plants that open or close their flowers at set times of day. He proposed the concept in his 1751 publication Philosophia Botanica, calling it the horologium florae (lit. 'flower clock'). His observations of how plants changed over time are summarised in several publications. Calendarium florae (the Flower Almanack) describes the seasonal changes in nature and the botanic garden during the year 1755. In Somnus plantarum (the Sleep of Plants), he describes how different plants prepare for sleep during the night, and in Vernatio arborum he gives an account of the timing of leaf-bud burst in different trees and bushes. He may never have planted such a garden, but the idea was attempted by several botanical gardens in the early 19th century, with mixed success. Many plants exhibit a strong circadian rhythm (see also Chronobiology), and a few have been observed to open at quite a regular time, but the accuracy of such a clock is diminished because flowering time is affected by weather and seasonal effects. The flowering times recorded by Linnaeus are also subject to differences in daylight due to latitude: his measurements are based on flowering times in Uppsala, where he taught and had received his university education.

The plants suggested for use by Linnaeus are given in the table below, ordered by recorded opening time; "-" signifies that data are missing.

Botanical name	Common name	Opening time	Closing time
Tragopogon pratensis	Goat's-Beard	3 a.m.	–
Leontodon hispidus L.	Rough Hawkbit	by 4 a.m.	–
Helminthotheca echioides (L.) Holub	Bristly ox-tongue	4–5 a.m.	–
Cichorium intybus L.	Chicory	4–5 a.m.	–
Crepis tectorum L.	Hawk's Beard	4–5 a.m.	–
Reichardia tingitana (L.) Roth	False Sow thistle	by 6 a.m.	10 a.m.
Sonchus oleraceus L.	Sow thistle	5 a.m.	12 m.
Taraxacum officinale Weber	Dandelion	5 a.m.	8–9 a.m.
Crepis alpina L.	Hawk's beard	5 a.m.	11 a.m.
Tragopogon hybridus L.	Goat's beard	5 a.m.	11 a.m.
Rhagadiolus edulis Gaertner	–	5 a.m.	10 a.m.
Lapsana chondrilloides L.	–	5 a.m.	–
Convolvulus tricolor L.	Bindweed, Morning Glory	5 a.m.	–
Hypochaeris maculata L.	Spotted cat's ear	6 a.m.	4–5 p.m.
Hieracium umbellatum L.	Hawkweed	6 a.m.	5 p.m.
Hieracium murorum L.	Hawkweed	6 a.m.	2 p.m.
Crepis rubra L.	–	6 a.m.	1–2 p.m.
Sonchus arvensis L.	Field milk-thistle	6 a.m.	–
Sonchus palustris L.	Marsh sow-thistle	by 7 a.m.	2 p.m.
Leontodon autumnale L.	Hawkweed	7 a.m.	3 p.m.
Hieracium sabaudum L.	Hawkweed	7 a.m.	1–2 p.m.
Cicerbita alpina (L.) Wallr.	Blue sow-thistle	7 a.m.	12 p.m.
Lactuca sativa L.	Garden Lettuce	7 a.m.	10 a.m
Calendula pluvialis L.	–	7 a.m.	3–4 p.m.
Nymphaea alba L.	White Waterlily	7 a.m.	5 p.m.
Anthericum ramosum L.	St. Bernard's Lily	7 a.m.	–
Hypochaeris achyrophorus L.	–	7–8 a.m.	2 p.m.
Hedypnois rhagadioloides (L.) Schmidt subsp. cretica (L.) Hayck	–	7–8 a.m.	2 p.m.
Trichodiadema babrata (L.) Schwartes	–	7–8 a.m.	2 p.m.
Hieracium pilosella L.	Mouse-ear Hawkweed	8 a.m.	–
Anagallis arvensis L.	Scarlet pimpernell	8 a.m.	–
Petrorhagia prolifera (L.) Ball & Heywood	Proliferous Pink	8 a.m.	1 p.m.
Hypochaeris glabra L.	Smooth cat's-ear	9 a.m.	1 p.m.
Malva caroliniana L.	–	9–10 a.m.	1 p.m.
Spergularia rubra (L.) J. & C. Presl	Sand spurrey	9–10 a.m.	2–3 p.m.
Mesembryanthemum crystallinum	Ice-Plant	9–10 a.m.	3–4 p.m.
Cryophytum nodiflorum (L.) L. Bol.	Ice-Plant	10–11 a.m	3 p.m.
Calendula officinalis L.	Pot marigold	–	3 p.m.
Hieracium aurantiacum	Hawkweed	–	3–4 p.m.
Anthericium ramosum L. (syn. Anthericum album)	–	–	3–4 p.m.
Alyssum alyssoides L.	–	–	4 p.m.
Papaver nudicaule L.	Iceland poppy	–	7 p.m.
Hemerocallis lilioasphodelus L.	Day-lily	–	7–8 p.m.

== Cultural references to the concept ==
Some 30 years before Linnaeus's birth, such a floral clock may have been described by Andrew Marvell, in his poem "The Garden" (1678):

How well the skilful gardener drew

Of flow'rs and herbs this dial new;
Where from above the milder sun
Does through a fragrant zodiac run;
And, as it works, th' industrious bee
Computes its time as well as we.

How could such sweet and wholesome hours
Be reckoned but with herbs and flow'rs!

In Terry Pratchett's novel Thief of Time, a floral clock with the same premise is described. It features fictional flowers that open at night "for the moths", so runs all day.

Horologium Florae, released in 2023, is the album name of Japanese singer and virtual YouTuber Kyo Hanabasami.

== See also ==
- Floral clock
