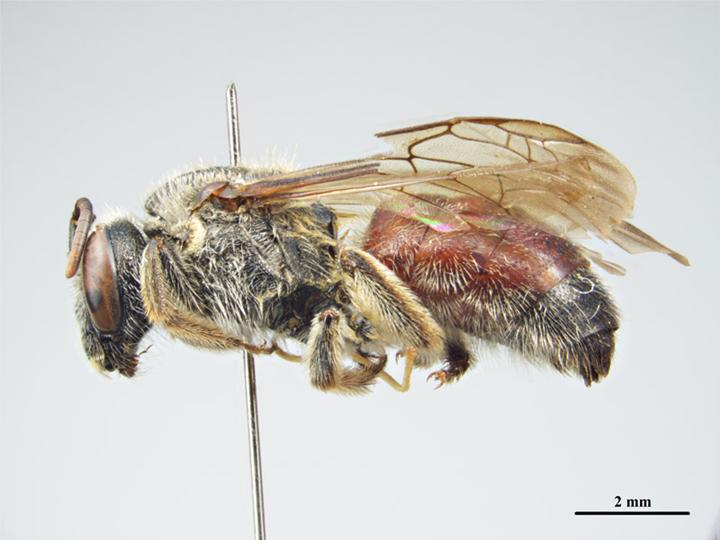
- Female

Scientific classification
- Kingdom: Animalia
- Phylum: Arthropoda
- Clade: Pancrustacea
- Class: Insecta
- Order: Hymenoptera
- Family: Halictidae
- Genus: Lasioglossum
- Species: L. altichum

Binomial name
- Lasioglossum altichum Smith, 1853

Synonyms
- Parasphecodes altichus Smith, 1853; Parasphecodes cirriferus Cockerell, 1910; Parasphecodes grandis Meyer, 1920; Parasphecodes insignis Meyer, 1920

= Lasioglossum altichum =

Species of bee

Lasioglossum altichum, or Lasioglossum (Parasphecodes) altichum, is a species of bee in the family Halictidae and subfamily Halictinae. It is endemic to Australia. It was described by English entomologist Frederick Smith in 1853.

== Distribution and habitat ==
The species occurs in south-eastern Australia.

== Behaviour ==
The adults are flying mellivores. Flowering plants visited by the bees include Achillea, Helichrysum, Hypochaeris, Senecio, Leucopogon, Pultenaea, Calytrix, Darwinia, Eucalyptus, Leptospermum, Melaleuca, Bursaria, Conospermum, Grevillea, Hakea and Boronia species.

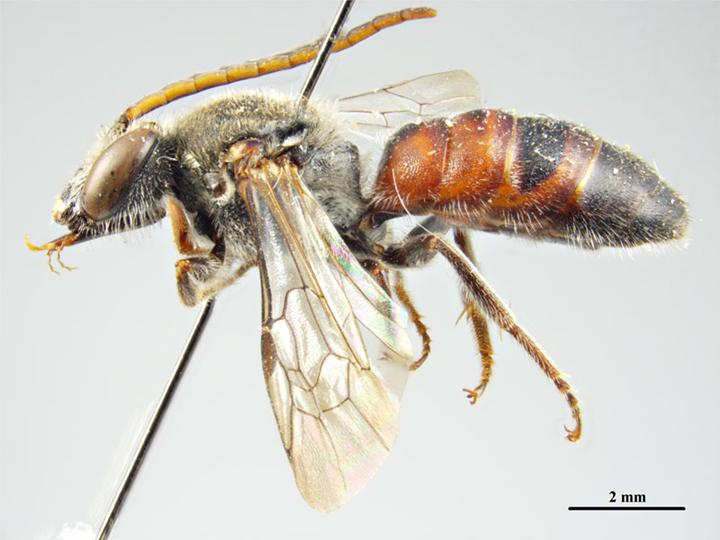
Male
