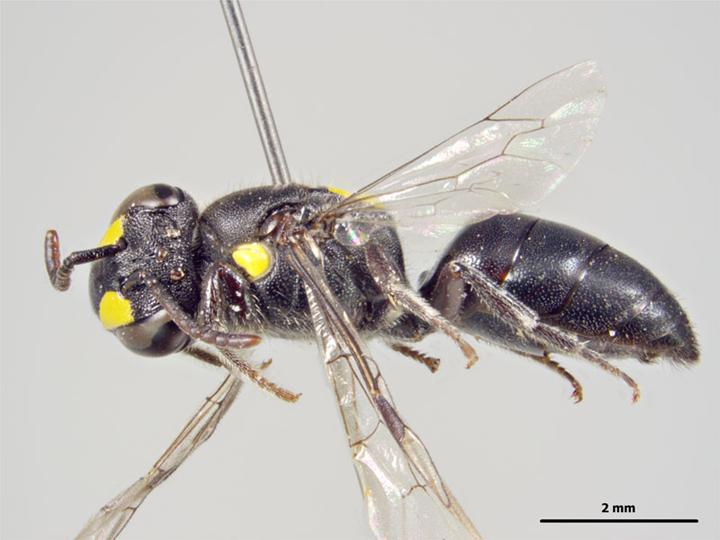
- Female

Scientific classification
- Kingdom: Animalia
- Phylum: Arthropoda
- Clade: Pancrustacea
- Class: Insecta
- Order: Hymenoptera
- Family: Colletidae
- Genus: Hylaeus
- Species: H. honestus

Binomial name
- Hylaeus honestus (Smith, 1879)

Synonyms
- Prosopis honesta Smith, 1879; Prosopis simillima Smith, 1879; Prosopis chrysognatha Cockerell, 1910; Prosopis leucosphaera Cockerell, 1913; Prosopis xanthosphaera Cockerell, 1913; Prosopis daveyi Cockerell, 1921; Prosopis capitata Friese, 1924; Prosopis maculiceps Friese, 1924; Hylaeus honestus subhonestus Cockerell, 1929

= Hylaeus honestus =

Species of bee

Hylaeus honestus, or Hylaeus (Euprosopis) honestus, is a species of bee in the family Colletidae and subfamily Hylaeinae. It is endemic to Australia. It was described by English entomologist Frederick Smith in 1879.

== Distribution and habitat ==
The species occurs across southern and south-eastern Australia. Type localities include Moreton Bay, Queensland; Melbourne, Croydon, Bright and Ararat, Victoria; and King Island and Sheffield, Tasmania.

== Behaviour ==
The adults are solitary flying mellivores. Flowering plants visited by the bees include Bursaria, Calytrix, Eucalyptus, Eugenia, Hypochaeris, Jacksonia, Leptospermum, Melaleuca and Pittosporum species.

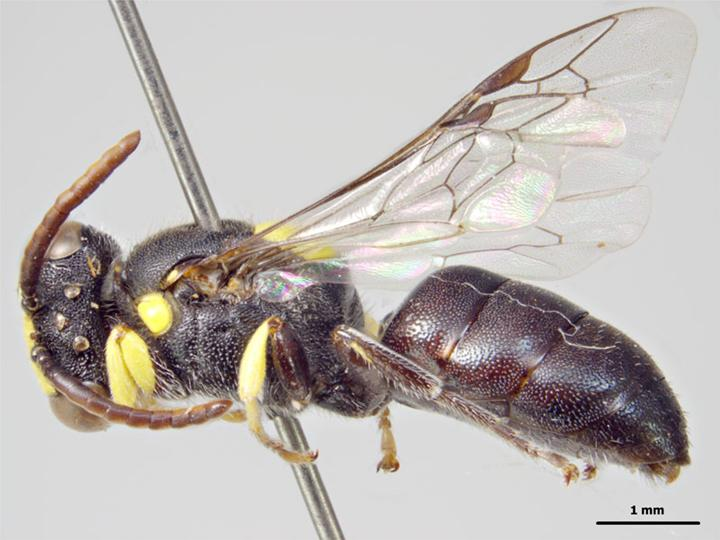
Male
