= False dandelion =

False dandelion is a common name for a number of plants similar to dandelions.

- Hypochaeris radicata, also known as cat's ears, the plant most commonly referred to as false dandelion
- Hypochaeris, other cat's ears related to H. radicata
- Agoseris, also known as mountain dandelions
- Crepis, also known as hawksbeards
- Hieracium, also known as hawkweeds
- Leontodon, also known as hawkbits
- Nothocalais
- Pyrrhopappus
- Scorzoneroides, also known as hawksbits
- Tussilago farfara, also known as coltsfoot
- Krigia, commonly called dwarf-dandelions, multiple species of which are sometimes called false dandelion

== See also ==
- Mock dandelion
