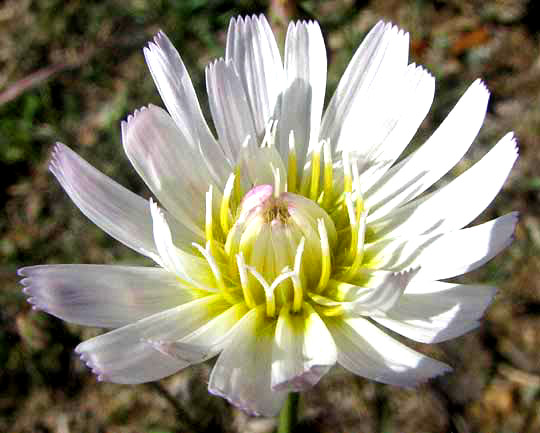
- Pinaropappus roseus floral head

Scientific classification
- Kingdom: Plantae
- Clade: Embryophytes
- Clade: Tracheophytes
- Clade: Angiosperms
- Clade: Eudicots
- Clade: Asterids
- Order: Asterales
- Family: Asteraceae
- Genus: Pinaropappus
- Species: P. roseus

Binomial name
- Pinaropappus roseus (Less.) Less.

Synonyms
- Achyrophorus roseus Less.

= Pinaropappus roseus =

Species of plant

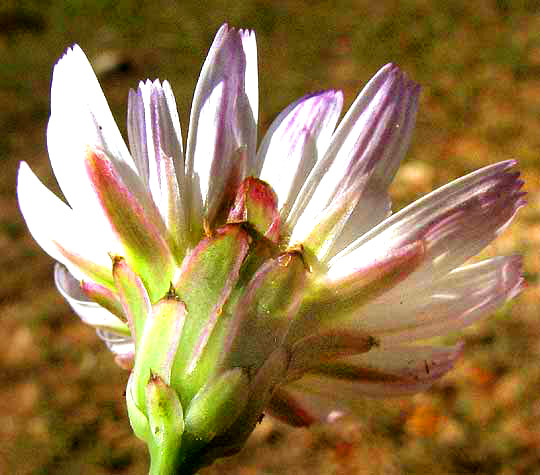
Involucral bracts

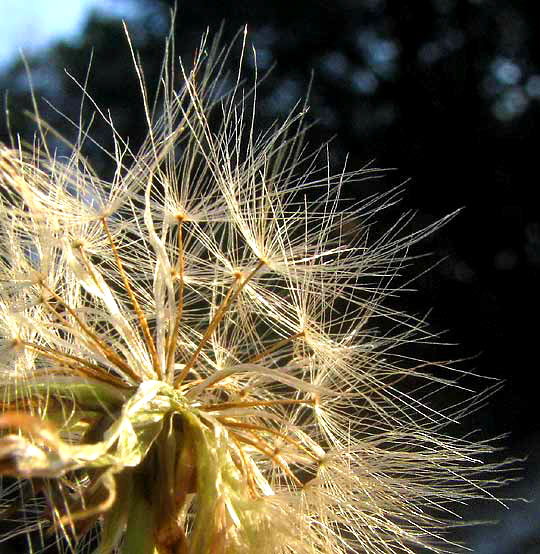
Cypselae with pale tan pappuses

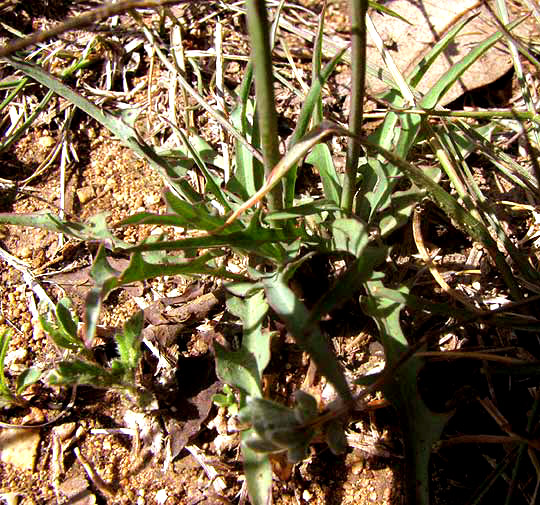
Basal leaves

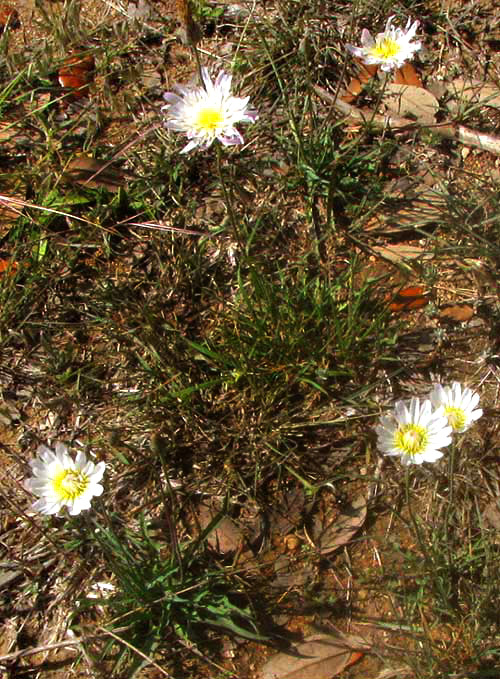
Flowering in habitat

Pinaropappus roseus, the white rocklettuce, is a species of wildflower native to the New World. It belongs to the family Asteraceae.

== Discription ==
Pinaropappus roseus, except for its white to pink flowers, is similar to and somewhat closely related to the dandelion. Here are noteworthy features helpful for seeing the distinguishing features of Pinaropappus roseus:

- Its 1-20+ stems stand up to 65.5 cm (26 in) high, but usually are shorter and often the plants grow in colonies. When injured, body parts exude a white latex. The woody taproot grows deep into the soil. Unlike Dandelions, the stems bear a few leaves.
- Upper leaves are small and slender, with smooth margins but leaves arising at the base often bear some low teeth and may be shallowly lobed. Lower leaves may be up to 12 cm (4 1/2 in) long and 3 cm (1 1/4 in) wide. All leaves are hairless or nearly so.
- Floral heads consist of up to 60 flat, petal-like "ray florets" with white to pink corollas up to 25 mm (1 in) long. Green involucral bracts below the florets form a cuplike "involucre." The bracts, up to 20 mm (3/4 in) long, are of unequal size and are arranged in spirals with their margins overlapping one another. Their pointed tips are dark brown.
- Very slender, one-seeded, cypsela-type fruits up to 8 mm (5/16 in) tall are pale brown. Each is topped by a pappus consisting of up to 60 tawny or yellowish-brown bristles up to 10 mm (3/8 in) long.

Apparently the corolla color varying from white to pink is not of taxonomic importance. It is reported that white flowers take on a pinkish hue as they age.

== Distribution ==
In the Southwestern United States, Pinaropappus roseus occurs in the states of Arizona, New Mexico, Oklahoma and Texas. In Mexico it is found nearly throughout, except in the Baja California Peninsula and the Yucatan Peninsula.

== Habitat ==
In the USA, Pinaropappus roseus occurs in open limestone areas, along roads, on cliffs and in open grassy flats at elevations from 50–2,600 m (160–8,530 ft). In highland central Mexico it occurs in secondary vegetation derived from various vegetation types, and sometimes in disturbed, weedy areas up to 2,900 m (9,500 ft) in elevation.

== Flowering time ==
Pinaropappus roseus flowers open in early morning and may close by midmorning. In central Mexico the species can be found flowering throughout the year, but mainly from April to September.

== In traditional medicine ==
In the Sierra Norte de Oaxaca region of Mexico's Oaxaca state, where Pinaropappus roseus is known as espule, chipule, or chipulillo, it is used to treat vomiting and measles. In Oaxaca and Puebla states also it is used for skin problems, especially rashes on newborn babies. For this latter use the entire plant is boiled and the water is used to bathe the baby. After bathing the baby is given a "tea" prepared from the leaves, with a little sugar added to counter the bitter taste. In Morelos state, the plant's white sap is applied to white blotches which appear on the face and hands.

== Taxonomy ==
In 1832 Christian Friedrich Lessing formally named and described Pinaropappus roseus as he erected a new genus for it, Pinaropappus. In 1830 Lessing himself had described the new species Achyrophorus roseus, upon which in 1832 Pinaropappus roseus was based. In establishing Pinaropappus he noted that it was different from Achyrophorus because of its species' hairy, sordid, and not manifestly pale-colored pappus. Later Achyrophorus was lumped into the genus Hypochaeris.

=== Infraspecies ===
In 2026, these two varieties were accepted:

- Pinaropappus roseus var. maculatus McVaugh -- in the Mexican states of Coahuila and Nuevo León
- Pinaropappus roseus var. roseus -- range of the species

=== Etymology ===
The genus name Pinaropappus derives from the Greek pinario meaning "dirty, squalid," plus pappos, thus the genus name alludes to the dingy color the taxon's pappuses.

The species name roseus is based on the Latin roseus, one definition of which is "rose-colored, red." This alludes to the pink hue of many corollas of the species.
