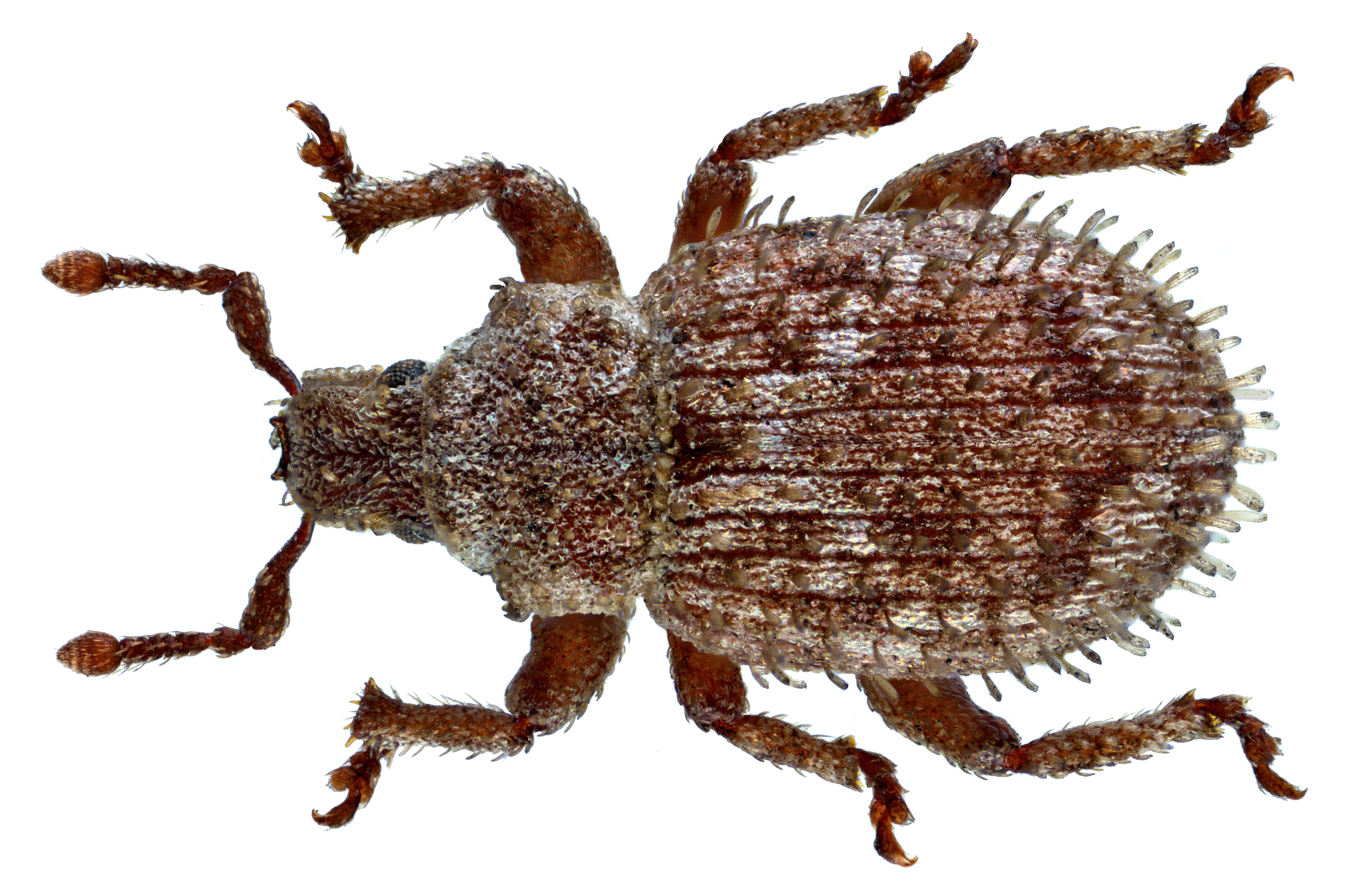
- Trachyphloeus scabriculus

Scientific classification
- Kingdom: Animalia
- Phylum: Arthropoda
- Class: Insecta
- Order: Coleoptera
- Suborder: Polyphaga
- Infraorder: Cucujiformia
- Family: Curculionidae
- Genus: Trachyphloeus; Germar, 1817

= Trachyphloeus =

Genus of beetles

Trachyphloeus is a genus of snout and bark beetles in the family Curculionidae. There are at least 80 described species in Trachyphloeus.

== Species ==
- Trachyphloeus algesiranus Escalera, 1923
- Trachyphloeus alpinus Hustache, 1937
- Trachyphloeus alternans Gyllenhal, 1834
- Trachyphloeus angustus Borovec, 1991
- Trachyphloeus antoinei Escalera, 1924
- Trachyphloeus argentatus Pic, 1908
- Trachyphloeus atlasicus Hustache, 1939
- Trachyphloeus belloi Borovec & Osella, 1993
- Trachyphloeus biskrensis Pic, 1903
- Trachyphloeus brevicornis A. & F. Solari, 1905
- Trachyphloeus caldarai Borovec & Osella, 2002
- Trachyphloeus caussenardus Pericart, 1964
- Trachyphloeus cinereus A. & F. Solari, 1905
- Trachyphloeus colasi Ruter, 1938
- Trachyphloeus colonnellii Borovec & Osella, 2002
- Trachyphloeus confusus Formanek, 1907
- Trachyphloeus corniculatus Hoffmann, 1956
- Trachyphloeus corsicus Borovec, 1999
- Trachyphloeus crassicornis Borovec, 1996
- Trachyphloeus denticulatus Escalera, 1914
- Trachyphloeus desbrochersi Stierlin, 1885
- Trachyphloeus difformis Formanek, 1907
- Trachyphloeus digitalis Gyllenhal, 1827
- Trachyphloeus distinguendus Formanek, 1907
- Trachyphloeus elongatus Borovec, 1991
- Trachyphloeus erikae Borovec, 1993
- Trachyphloeus escalerae Lona, 1937
- Trachyphloeus euphorbiae Borovec, 2003
- Trachyphloeus fairmairei Reitter, 1874
- Trachyphloeus fusciscapus Desbrochers des Loges, 1909
- Trachyphloeus gallicus Borovec, 1989
- Trachyphloeus godarti Seidlitz, 1868
- Trachyphloeus gonzalezi Borovec, 2014
- Trachyphloeus guadarramus Seidlitz, 1868
- Trachyphloeus heymesi Hubenthal, 1934
- Trachyphloeus hispanicus Borovec, 1989
- Trachyphloeus ifranensis Borovec, 2014
- Trachyphloeus ilvensis Borovec & Osella, 2009
- Trachyphloeus italicus Hoffmann, 1956
- Trachyphloeus kocheri Hustache, 1938
- Trachyphloeus laticollis Boheman, 1843
- Trachyphloeus lothari Borovec, 1991
- Trachyphloeus margheritae Borovec & Osella, 1993
- Trachyphloeus melitensis Borovec & Osella, 1993
- Trachyphloeus melonii Borovec & Osella, 2003
- Trachyphloeus meregallii Borovec, 1989
- Trachyphloeus monspeliensis Hustache, 1932
- Trachyphloeus muralis Bedel, 1893
- Trachyphloeus muricatus Stierlin, 1885
- Trachyphloeus nodifrons Hoffmann, 1968
- Trachyphloeus nodipennis Chevrolat, 1860
- Trachyphloeus notatipennis Pic, 1903
- Trachyphloeus nuragicus Borovec & Osella, 2003
- Trachyphloeus oranensis Borovec, 2013
- Trachyphloeus orbipennis Desbrochers des Loges, 1901
- Trachyphloeus orbitalis Seidlitz, 1868
- Trachyphloeus ovipennis Formanek, 1907
- Trachyphloeus parallelus Seidlitz, 1868
- Trachyphloeus pelletieri Borovec, 1999
- Trachyphloeus pericarti Borovec, 1991
- Trachyphloeus pici Formanek, 1907
- Trachyphloeus pierottii Borovec, 1991
- Trachyphloeus planophthalmus Reitter, 1896
- Trachyphloeus pollicatus Formanek, 1907
- Trachyphloeus proximus A. & F. Solari, 1905
- Trachyphloeus pseudodenticulatus Borovec, 2014
- Trachyphloeus pustulatus Seidlitz, 1868
- Trachyphloeus recognitus Hoffmann, 1932
- Trachyphloeus rectus C.G. Thomson, 1865
- Trachyphloeus reichei Seidlitz, 1868
- Trachyphloeus romanifilii Borovec, 2014
- Trachyphloeus rouaulti Borovec, 2014
- Trachyphloeus scabriculus (Linnaeus, 1771)
- Trachyphloeus seidlitzii (C.N.F. Brisout de Barneville, 1866)
- Trachyphloeus solariorum Formanek, 1907
- Trachyphloeus solitus Borovec, 1999
- Trachyphloeus spinimanus Germar, 1824
- Trachyphloeus staifi Borovec, 1993
- Trachyphloeus stuebeni Borovec, 2003
- Trachyphloeus subsetulosus Escalera, 1923
- Trachyphloeus svatavae Borovec, 2013
- Trachyphloeus syriacus Seidlitz, 1868
- Trachyphloeus tarunahensis Borovec & Weill, 2013
- Trachyphloeus tenuipes Formanek, 1909
- Trachyphloeus tenuis Borovec, 1999
- Trachyphloeus truquii Seidlitz, 1868
