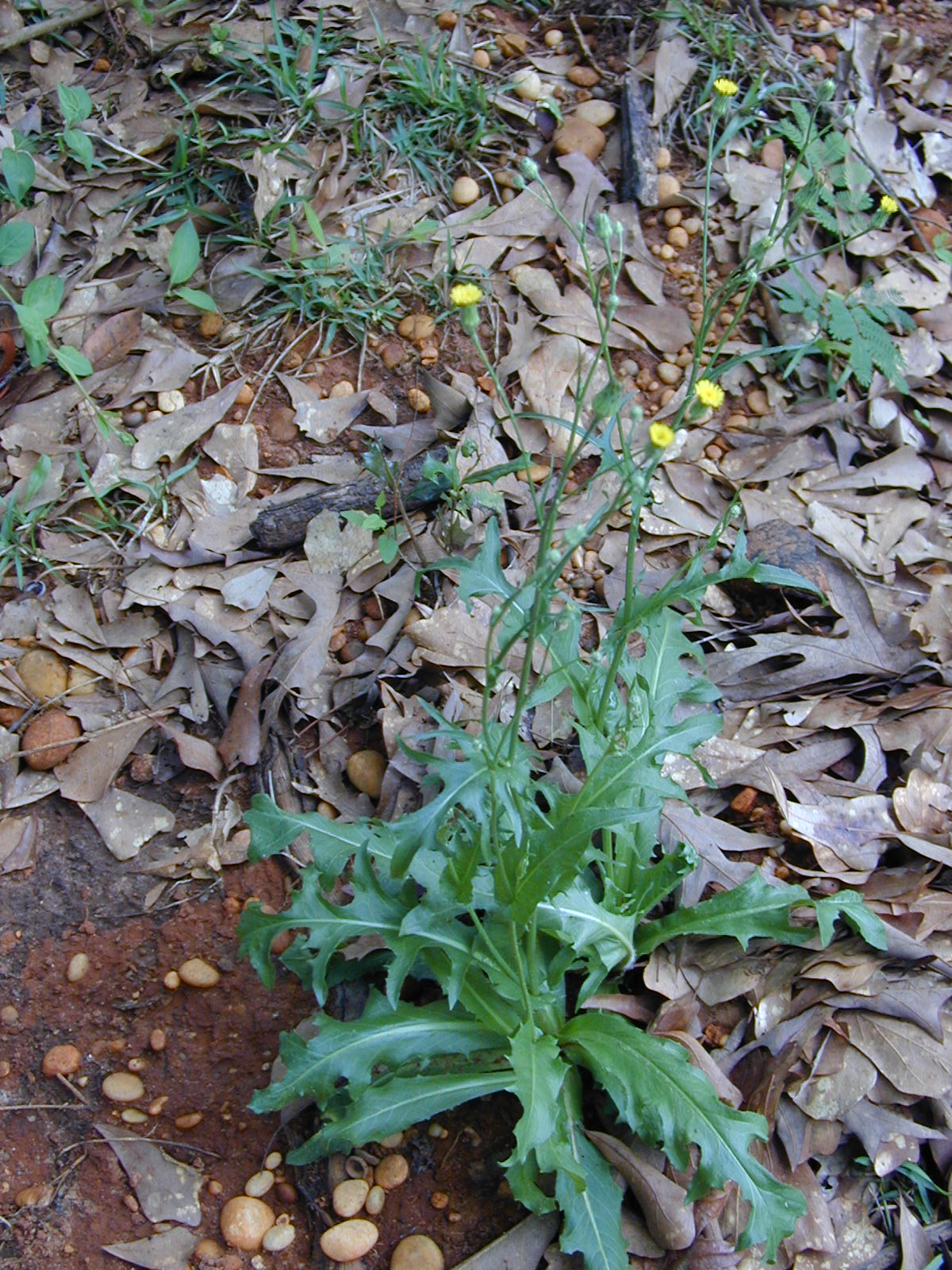

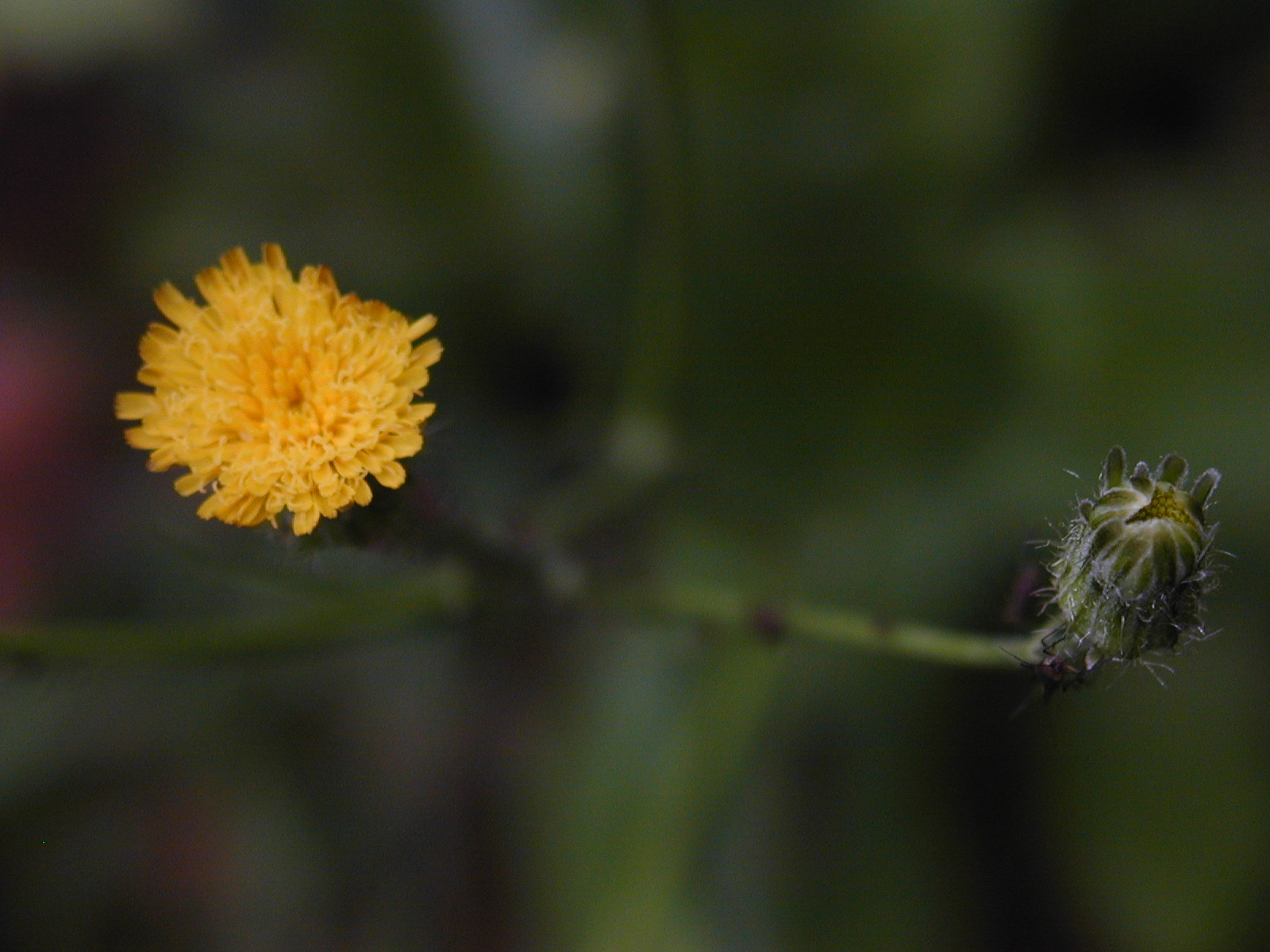

Scientific classification
- Kingdom: Plantae
- Clade: Embryophytes
- Clade: Tracheophytes
- Clade: Spermatophytes
- Clade: Angiosperms
- Clade: Eudicots
- Clade: Asterids
- Order: Asterales
- Family: Asteraceae
- Genus: Hypochaeris
- Species: H. chillensis

Binomial name
- Hypochaeris chillensis (Kunth) Britton 1892 not (Kunth) Hieron. 1901

Synonyms
- Synonymy: Apargia chillensis Kunth 1818; Achyrophorus selloi Sch.Bip.; Hypochaeris brasiliensis (Less.) Griseb.; Leontodon chilense (Kunth) DC.; Seriola brasiliensis (Less.) Less.; Porcellites brasiliensis Less.; Hypochaeris chilensis (Kunth) Britton; Achyrophorus chillensis (Kunth) Sch. Bip.; Hypochoeris chillensis (Kunth) Hieron.; Leontodon chillense (Kunth) DC.

= Hypochaeris chillensis =

Species of flowering plant

Hypochaeris chillensis (sometimes spelled Hypochoeris) also known as Brazilian cat's ear is a species of flowering plant in the family Asteraceae. It is native to South America (Argentina, Bolivia, Chile, Paraguay, Brazil, Uruguay) but has become naturalized in parts of North America, South Africa. and Taiwan. It is a common and widespread weed in the Southeast United States.

Hypochaeris chillensis is a perennial herb growing a taproot, a basal rosette of leaves, and one or more thin stems 20–60 centimetres (7.9–23.6 in) tall. The leaves are 5–25 centimetres (2.0–9.8 in) long, entire or lobed, and green. Atop the thin, naked stems are flower heads with small golden yellow ray florets, typically 1 centimetre (0.39 in) in diameter.

== Uses ==
Hypochaeris chillensis is used as medicinal plant in Brazil. The leaves and roots are edible either raw or cooked. In the state of Rio Grande do Sul, it is consumed raw as component of green salads.

== Gallery ==
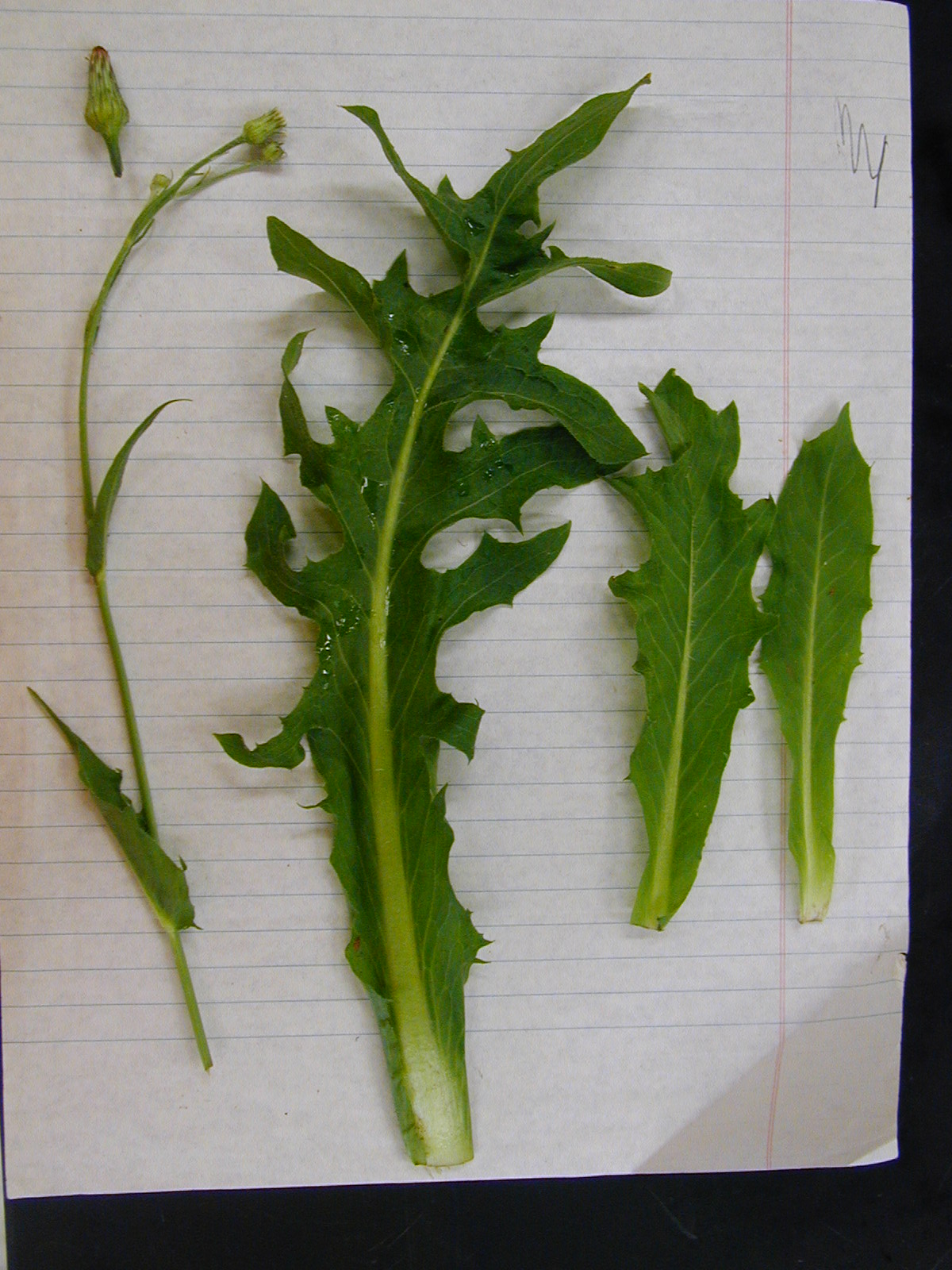
leaves

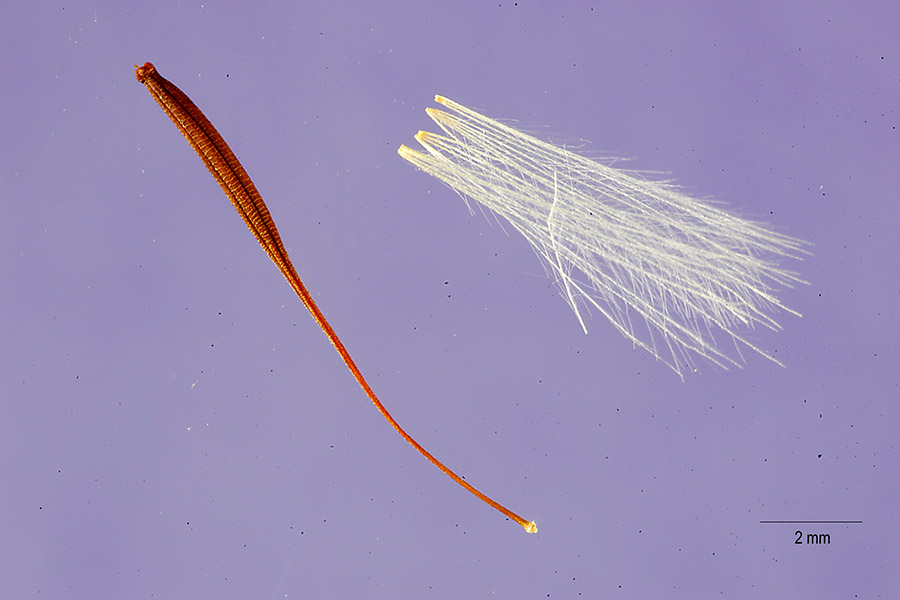
seeds
