= Trachyphloeus alternans =

Scientific classification
- Kingdom: Animalia
- Phylum: Arthropoda
- Clade: Pancrustacea
- Class: Insecta
- Order: Coleoptera
- Suborder: Polyphaga
- Infraorder: Cucujiformia
- Family: Curculionidae
- Genus: Trachyphloeus
- Species: T. alternans

Binomial name
- Trachyphloeus alternans Gyllenhal, 1834

Species of beetle

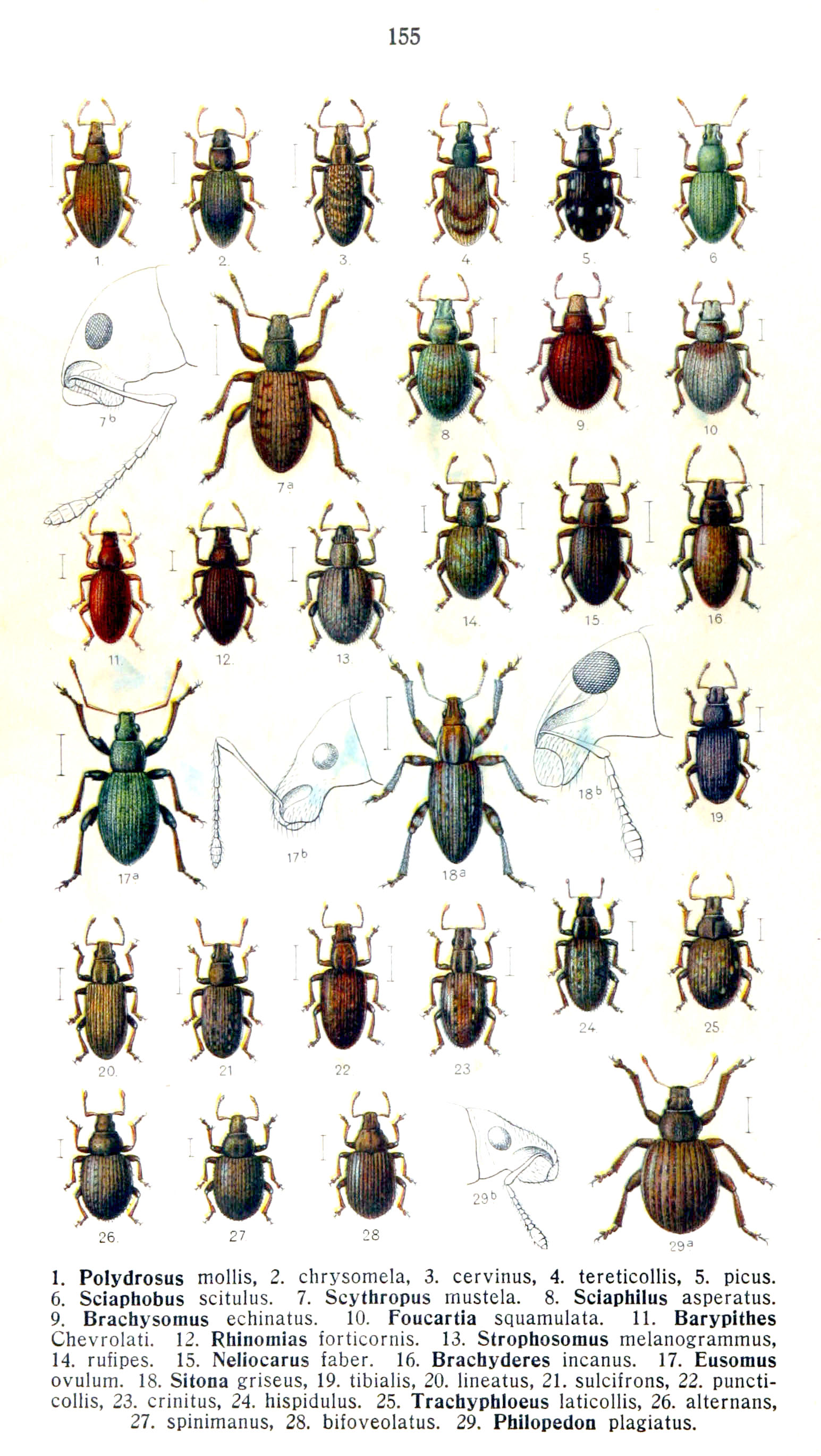

Trachyphloeus alternans is a species of snout or bark beetle in the family Curculionidae.
