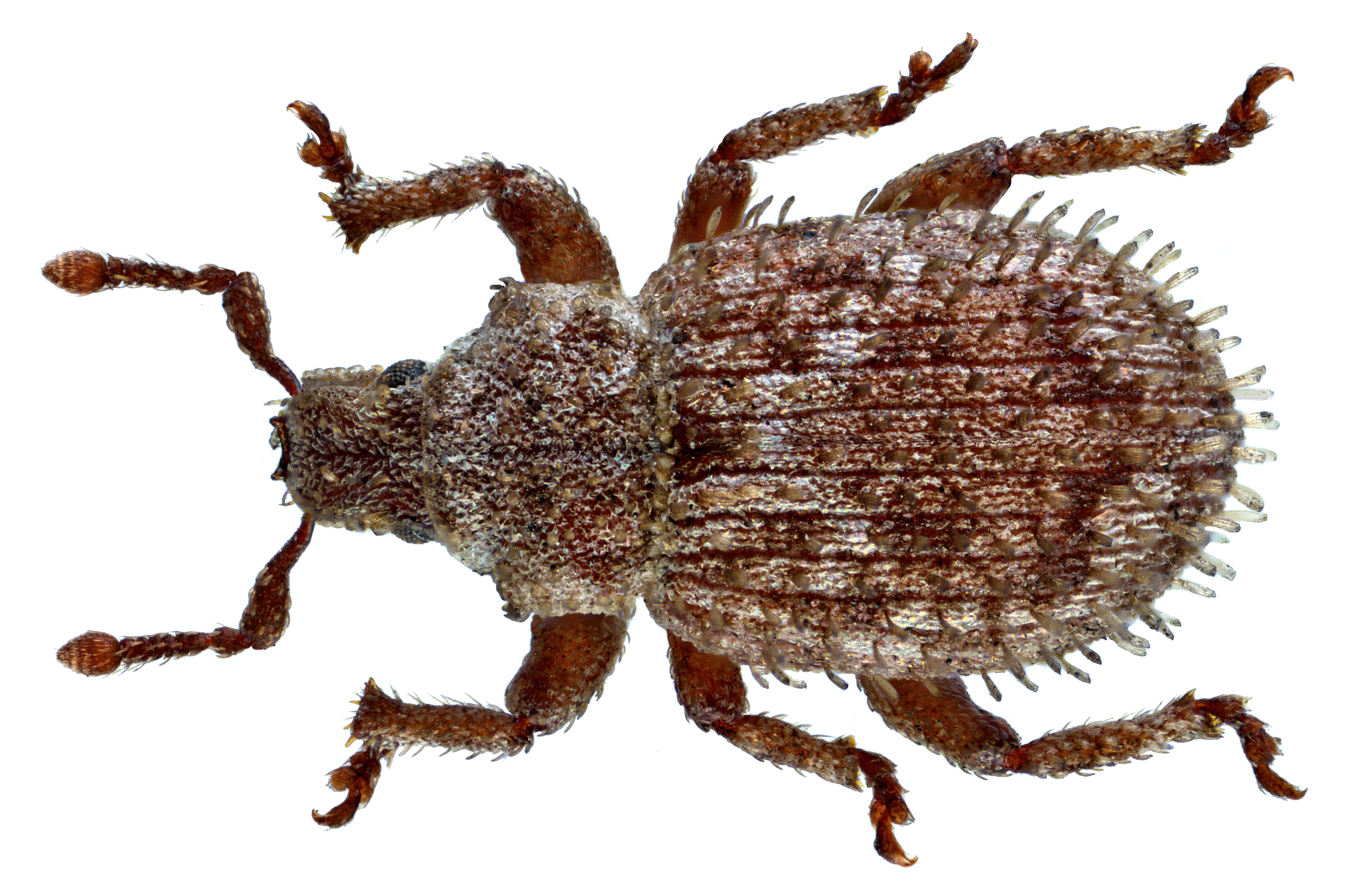

Scientific classification
- Kingdom: Animalia
- Phylum: Arthropoda
- Clade: Pancrustacea
- Class: Insecta
- Order: Coleoptera
- Suborder: Polyphaga
- Infraorder: Cucujiformia
- Superfamily: Curculionoidea
- Family: Curculionidae
- Genus: Trachyphloeus
- Species: T. scabriculus

Binomial name
- Trachyphloeus scabriculus (Linnaeus, 1771)

= Trachyphloeus scabriculus =

Species of beetle

Trachyphloeus scabriculus is a species of weevil native to Europe. It has been reported in Canada, feeding upon Hypochaeris radicata.
