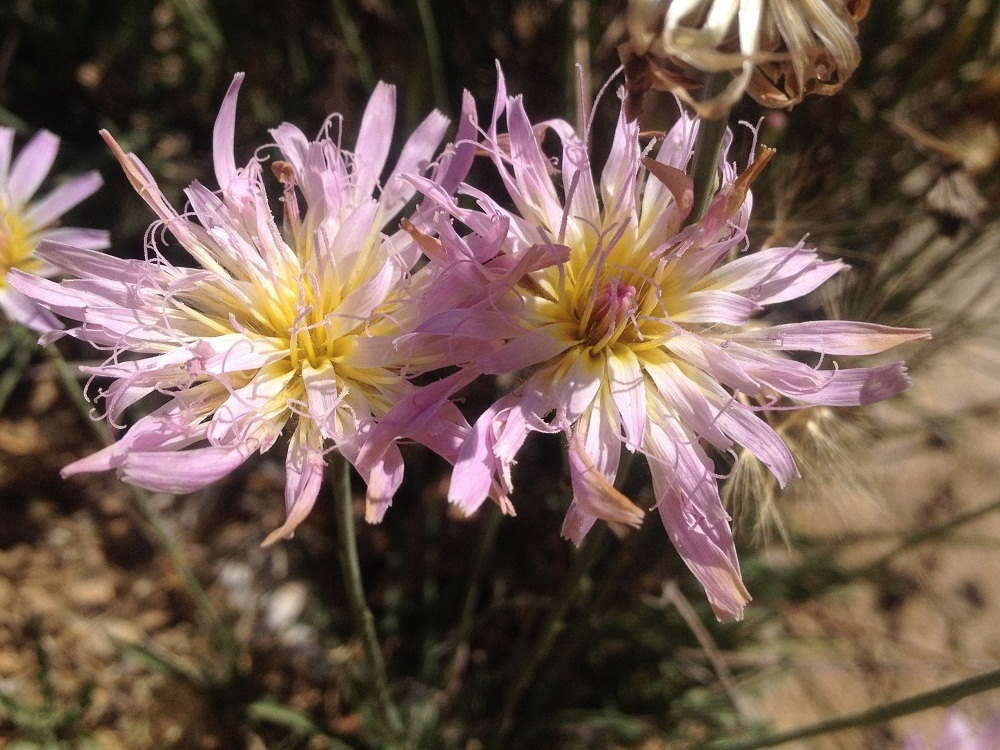
- Pinaropappus roseus

Scientific classification
- Kingdom: Plantae
- Clade: Tracheophytes
- Clade: Angiosperms
- Clade: Eudicots
- Clade: Asterids
- Order: Asterales
- Family: Asteraceae
- Subfamily: Cichorioideae
- Tribe: Cichorieae
- Subtribe: Microseridinae
- Genus: Pinaropappus; Less.

Type species
- Pinaropappus roseus (Less.) Less.

= Pinaropappus =

Genus of flowering plants

Pinaropappus, common name rocklettuce, is a genus of flowering plants in the tribe Cichorieae within the family Asteraceae, native to Mesoamerica and the southwestern United States.

Species

- Pinaropappus diguetii McVaugh - Jalisco
- Pinaropappus junceus A.Gray - Sonora
- Pinaropappus mojadanus B.L.Turner - Coahuila
- Pinaropappus multicaulis Brandegee - San Luis Potosí
- Pinaropappus parvus S.F.Blake - Chihuahua, United States (TX NM)
- Pinaropappus pattersonii B.L.Turner - Nuevo León
- Pinaropappus pooleanus B.L.Turner - Chihuahua
- Pinaropappus powellii B.L.Turner - Coahuila
- Pinaropappus roseus (Less.) Less. - United States (TX NM OK AZ), Mexico (from Chihuahua to Oaxaca)
- Pinaropappus spathulatus Brandegee - Guatemala, Chiapas, Veracruz, Puebla
