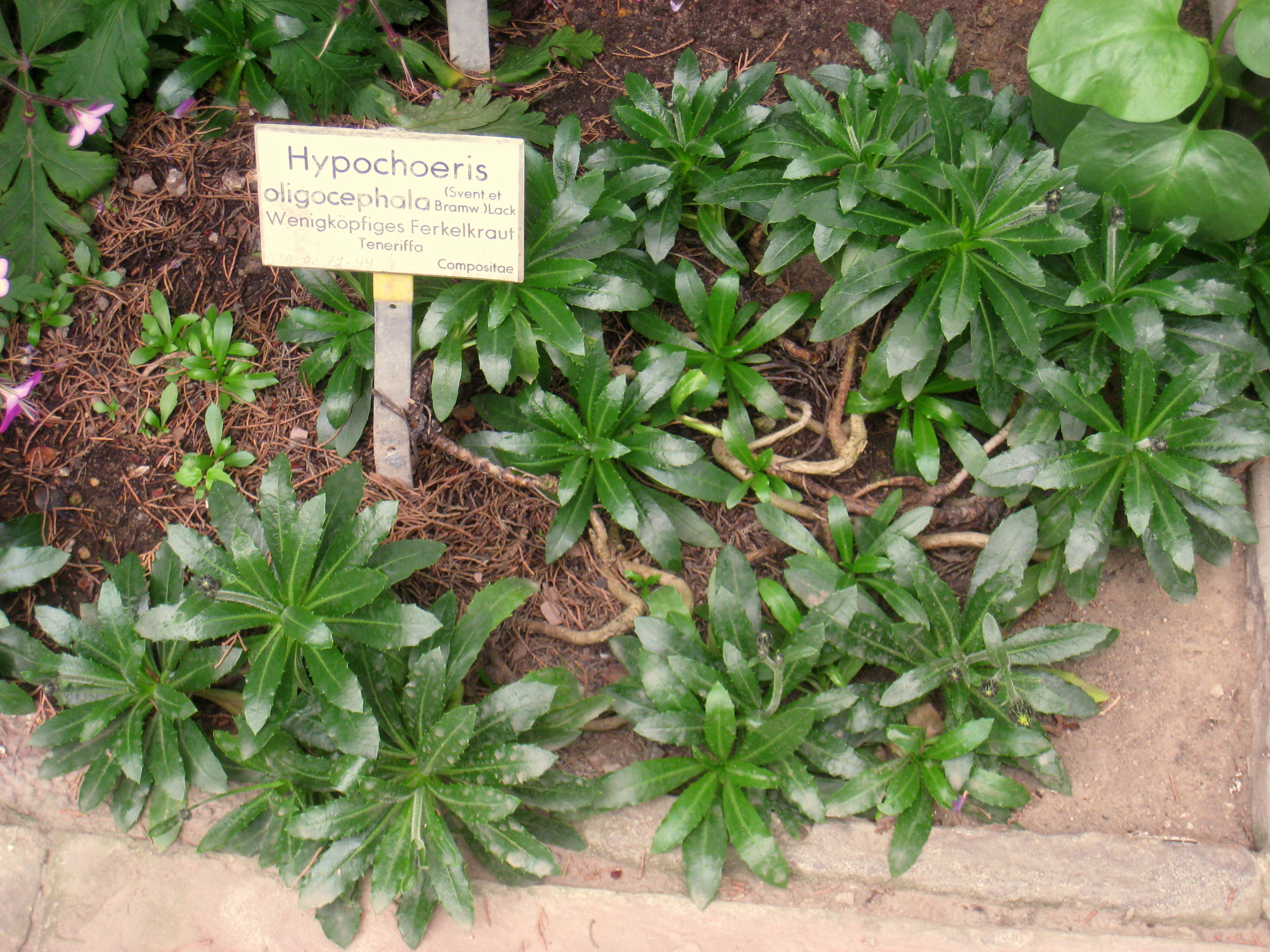
- Berlin Botanical Garden

Scientific classification
- Kingdom: Plantae
- Clade: Tracheophytes
- Clade: Angiosperms
- Clade: Eudicots
- Clade: Asterids
- Order: Asterales
- Family: Asteraceae
- Genus: Hypochaeris
- Species: H. oligocephala

Binomial name
- Hypochaeris oligocephala (Svent. & Bramw.) Lack 1978

Synonyms
- Heywoodiella oligocephala Svent. & Bramwell 1971

= Hypochaeris oligocephala =

Species of flowering plant

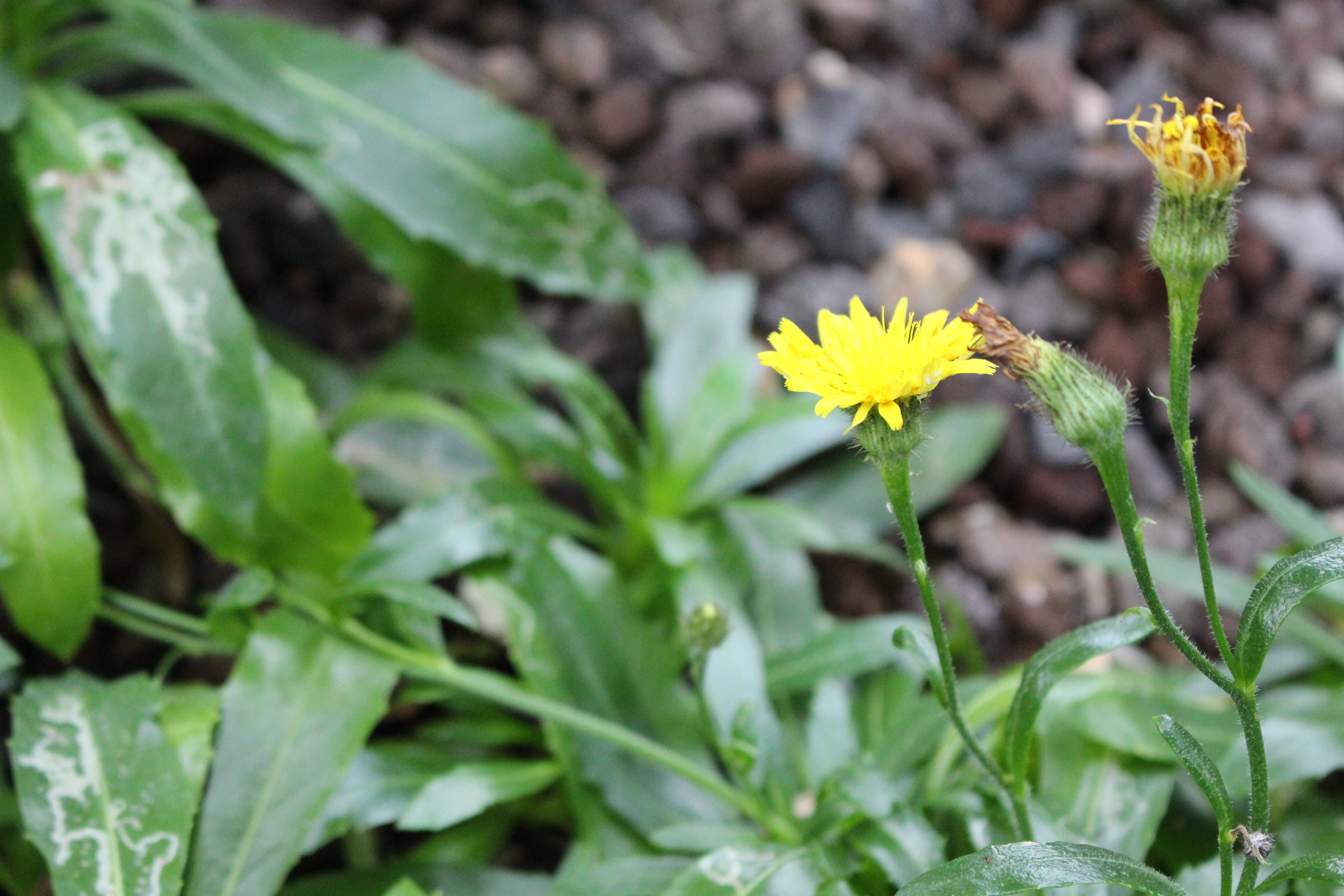
Flowers

Hypochaeris oligocephala is a species of flowering plant in the family Asteraceae native to the Canary Islands.
