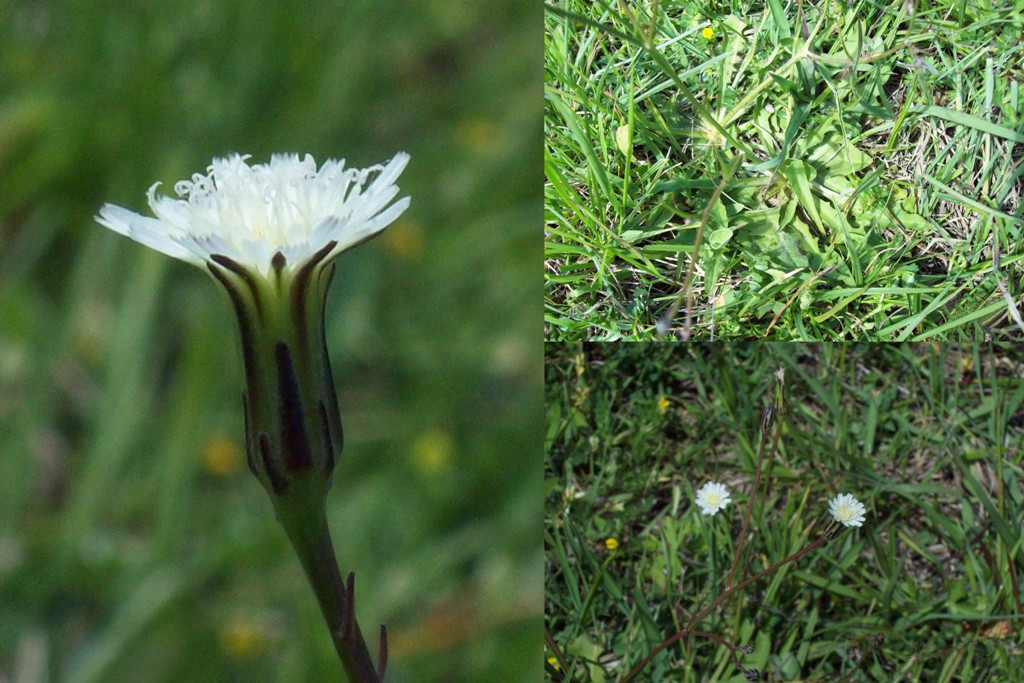
- Hypochaeris microcephala var. microcephala

Scientific classification
- Kingdom: Plantae
- Clade: Tracheophytes
- Clade: Angiosperms
- Clade: Eudicots
- Clade: Asterids
- Order: Asterales
- Family: Asteraceae
- Genus: Hypochaeris
- Species: H. microcephala

Binomial name
- Hypochaeris microcephala (Sch.Bip.) Cabrera 1937

Synonyms
- Achyrophorus microcephalus Sch. Bip. 1859; Hypochaeris brasiliensis var. microcephala (Sch. Bip.) Baker; Seriola brasiliensis var. parviflora Hook. & Arn.

= Hypochaeris microcephala =

Species of flowering plant

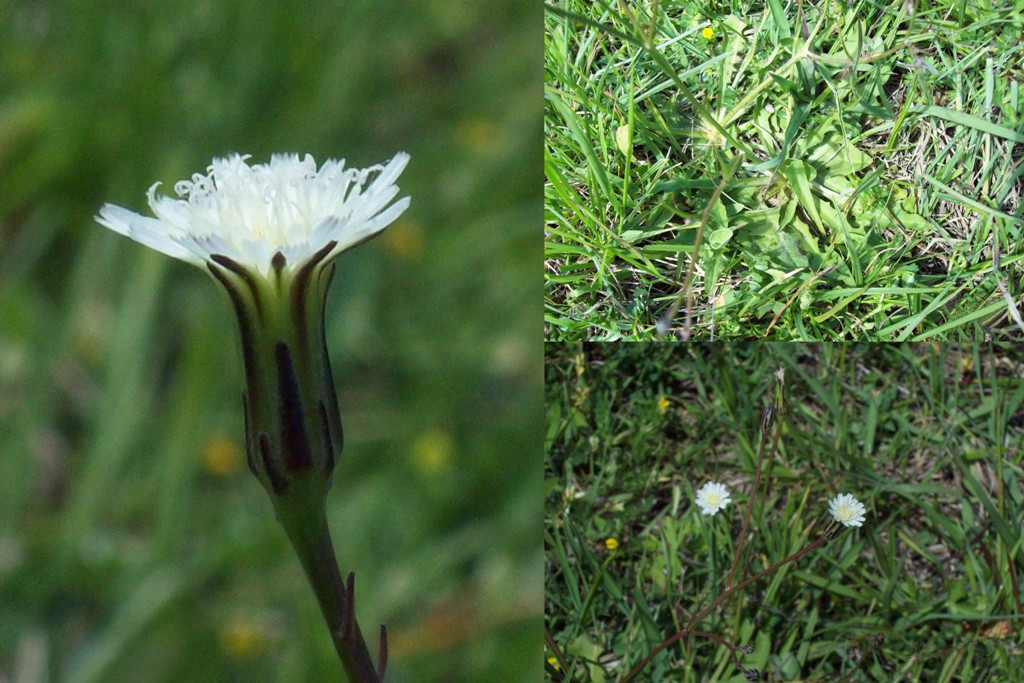

Hypochaeris microcephala, the smallhead cat's ear, is a species of plants in the tribe Cichorieae within the family Asteraceae. It is native to South America (Argentina, Chile, Bolivia, Paraguay, Brazil, Uruguay) and naturalized in parts of North America (for example in the south-central United States (Texas, Louisiana, etc.)).

Hypochaeris microcephala is a perennial herb with a thick taproot and a woody caudex. Some of the leaves are clumped around the base of the stem, while others grow higher up. One plant will produce 1–13 flower heads, each head with 50–100 white ray flowers but no disc flowers.
