= Stringhalt =

Type of horse injury

Stringhalt is a sudden flexion of one or both hind legs in horses and donkeys, most easily seen while the animal is walking or trotting. It is most evident when backing up slowly, turning on the affected leg, or suddenly frightened. It can involve one or both hind legs. It is a spasmodic contraction of the lateral extensor tendons of the hind legs.

An example of bilateral stringhalt in a horse: the hocks are spasmodically and rapidly flexed with the feet held high before quick placement back on the ground. The condition is more evident during turning and backing.

There are four forms of stringhalt:

1. Australian stringhalt: a flatweed (Hypochaeris radicata) is the suspected cause
2. Pseudostringhalt: the apparent result of a painful condition in the affected leg
3. Unilateral stringhalt: cause unknown, but often relieved by section of the lateral extensor tendon
4. Bilateral stringhalt: in two out of two affected horses necropsied, abnormal thalamus

Treatment varies.

== Australian stringhalt ==
Australian stringhalt was described and differentiated from classical stringhalt in 1884. Australian stringhalt is differentiated from classical stringhalt by the severity, occurrence of outbreaks, distinct seasonal pattern and the ability of affected horses to recover spontaneously. This condition is characterised by the sudden exaggerated flexion of either one or both hocks. This form of stringhalt most commonly occurs in the summer and autumn while horses are out on pasture. Epidemics of Australian stringhalt are usually witnessed during drought or abnormally dry conditions.

=== Affected areas in the horse ===
The long digital extensor muscle (usually in the hind limb) is the muscle that appears to be the most affected by this condition. The most severe muscle lesions have been found within the long and lateral digital extensors and lateral deep digital flexor. The location of neuromuscular lesions in Australian stringhalt may be explained by the susceptibility of longer, larger myelinated nerve fibres to injury. Regenerating nerve fibres with disproportionately thin myelin sheaths are more common in the proximal parts of affected nerves in horses with Australian stringhalt. Distal axonopathy occurs most severely in the longest nerve in the horse. The cause for this distal axonopathy remains unknown.

=== Treatment ===
Horses affected with this condition rarely recover without surgical intervention, although there have been some instances where horses have recovered without treatment. The recovery time in affected horses can range from three months to three years. Horses may be affected so severely that euthanasia is necessary. It is unknown how long it takes for clinical signs to develop after the exposure to the cause of the condition.

The majority of horses affected by stringhalt are dependent upon pasture for nutrition. Removal of the horse from its original paddock containing low-quality pasture, weeds and native grasses, along with dietary control, was the most common and successful treatment. Lateral digital extensor tenectomy has also been used as a treatment by veterinarians with a success rate of just over 50%.

Phenytoin has been used in the management of Australian stringhalt. Two weeks after treatment with phenytoin, significant improvement was observed in the gait abnormality of horses affected with Australian stringhalt at the trot and canter, but no significant improvement was observed at the walk or while turning.

=== Causes ===
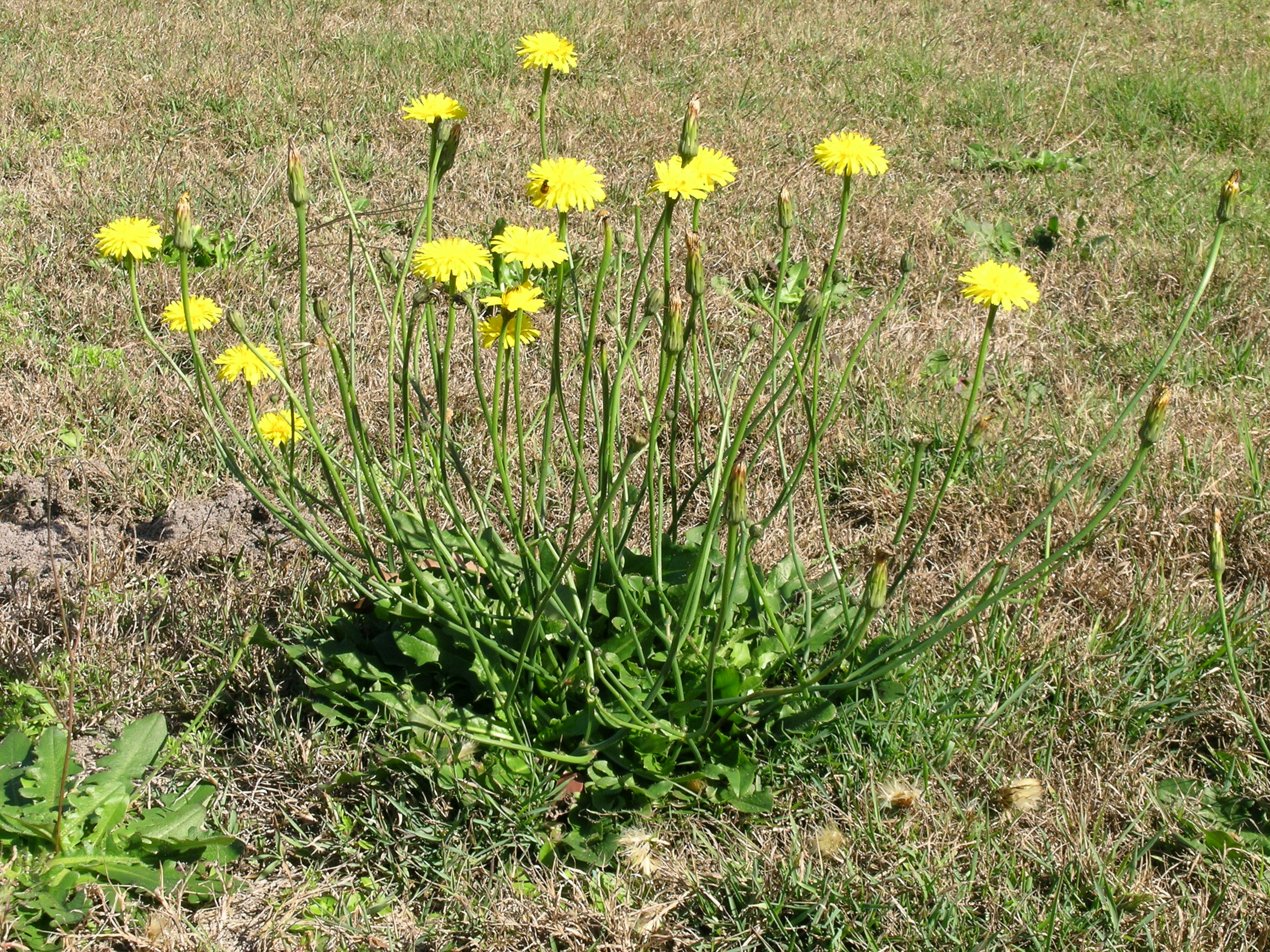
Hypochaeris radicata (flatweed) is linked to some cases of stringhalt in horses.

The most common plant species that have been found and identified in pastures where affected horses were located include: flatweed (Hypochaeris radicata), sheep's sorrel (Rumex acetosella) and couch grass (Elymus repens). The type of nerve damage sustained in horses with Australian stringhalt suggests a mould toxin (mycotoxin) or a fungal 'poison' found in the soils may be a cause for this condition. Mycotoxins can directly affect the long myelinated nerves in the hind limbs.

== See also ==
- Muscular system of the horse
- Scotty cramp, a condition in dogs that may resemble stringhalt in horses
