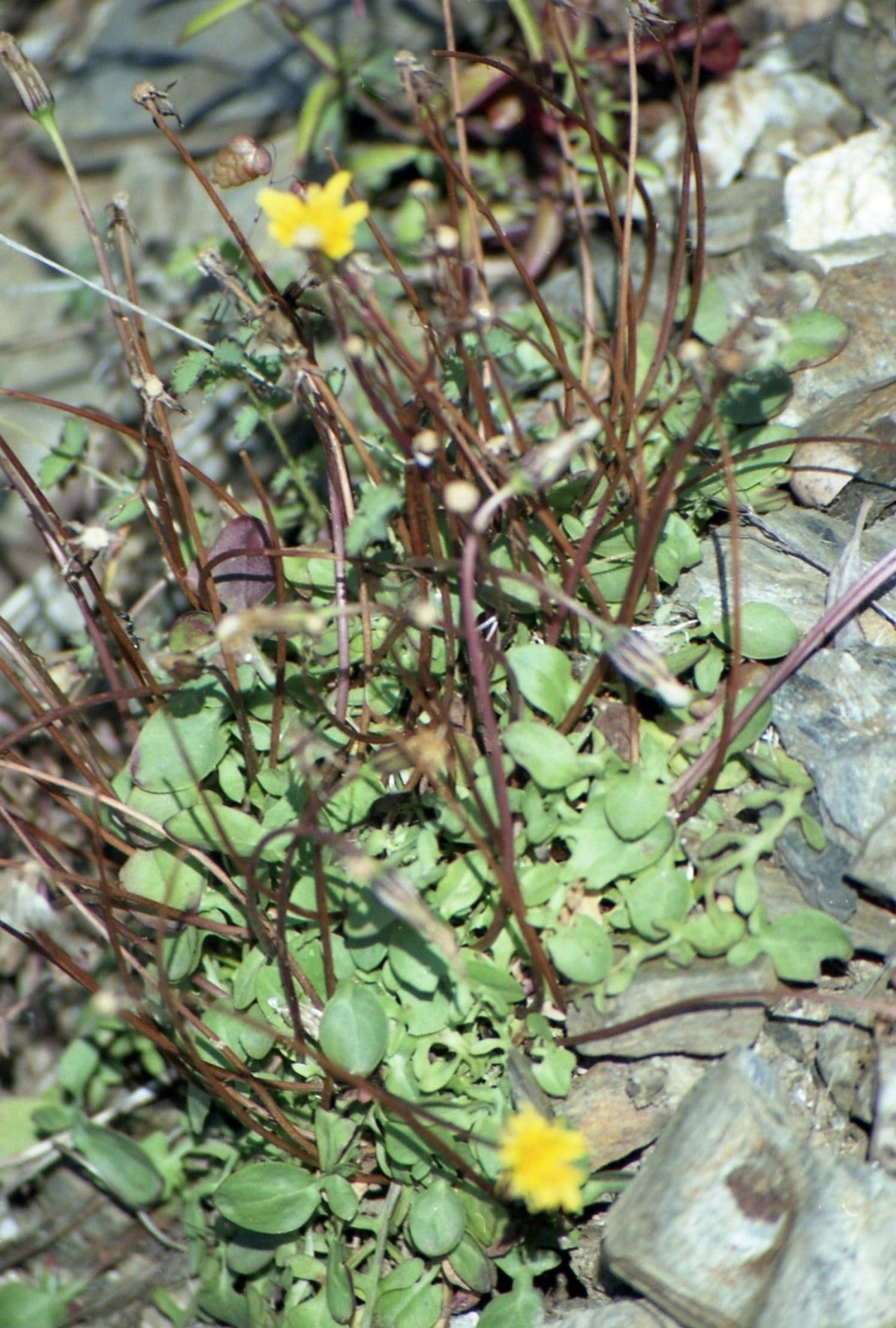

Scientific classification
- Kingdom: Plantae
- Clade: Tracheophytes
- Clade: Angiosperms
- Clade: Eudicots
- Clade: Asterids
- Order: Asterales
- Family: Asteraceae
- Genus: Hypochaeris
- Species: H. robertia

Binomial name
- Hypochaeris robertia (Sch.Bip.) Fiori 1910

Synonyms
- Achyrophorus robertia Sch.Bip. 1845; Hypochaeris taraxacoides (Loisel.) O.Hoffm.; Robertia taraxacoides (Loisel.) DC.; Seriola taraxacoides Loisel.; Seriola uniflora Biv.

= Hypochaeris robertia =

Species of flowering plant

Hypochaeris robertia is a Mediterranean species of plants in the tribe Cichorieae within the family Asteraceae. It grows in the central Mediterranean (Corsica, Sardinia, Sicily, Italy and North Africa) at elevations of 300–2,700 metres (980–8,860 ft) above sea level. It flowers from spring to autumn. Each flower head is 18–22 millimetres (0.71–0.87 in) in diameter.
