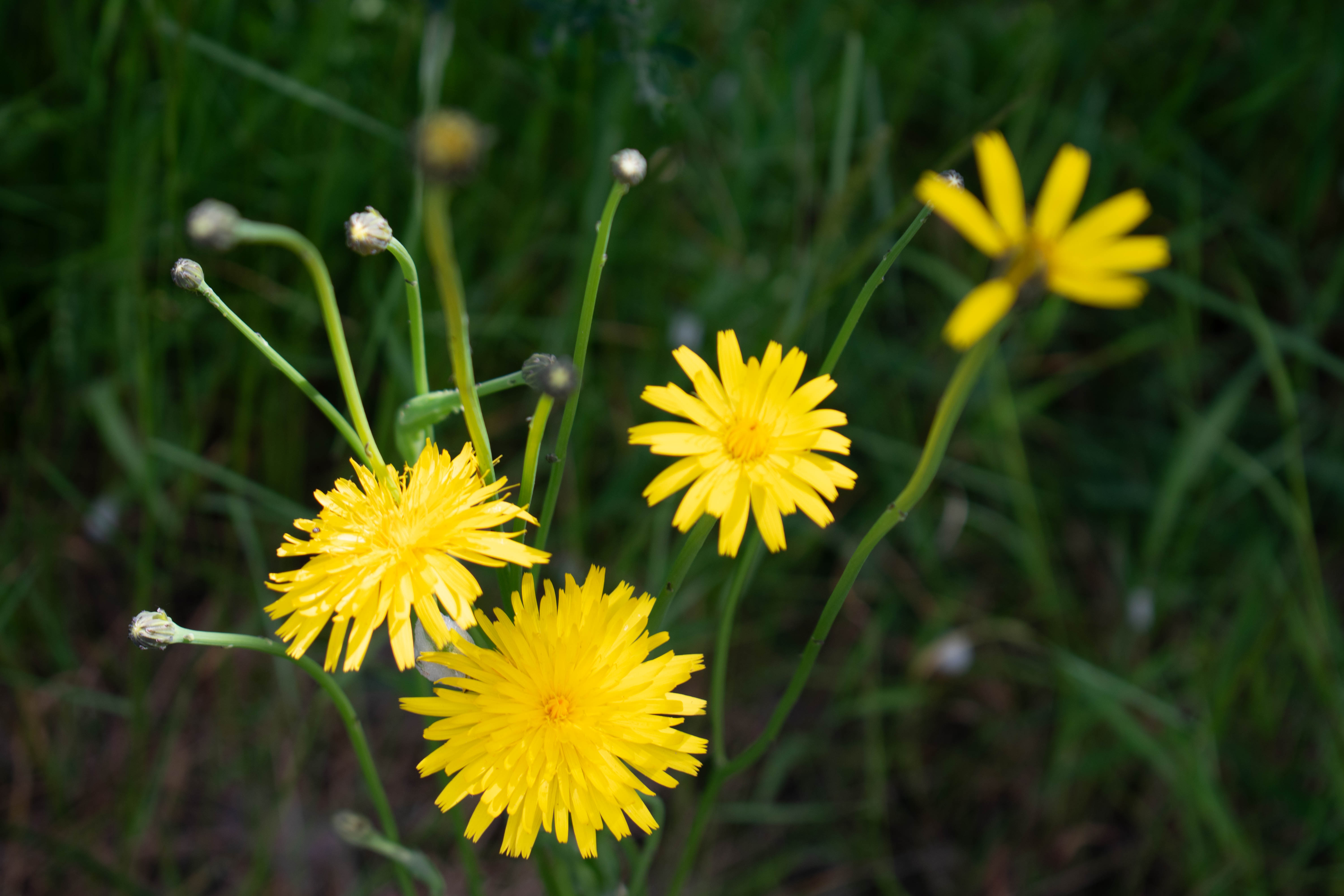

Scientific classification
- Kingdom: Plantae
- Clade: Tracheophytes
- Clade: Angiosperms
- Clade: Eudicots
- Clade: Asterids
- Order: Asterales
- Family: Asteraceae
- Genus: Hypochaeris
- Species: H. radicata

Binomial name
- Hypochaeris radicata L. 1753

Synonyms
- Synonymy: Hypochoeris radicata L.; Achyrophorus radicatus (L.) Scop.; Achyrophorus taraxacifolius (Salzm.) Sch.Bip.; Apargia serotina Jan ex Steud.; Crepis molokaiensis H.Lév.; Hypochaeris infesta Salisb.; Hypochaeris lasiophylla K.Koch ex Nyman; Hypochaeris neapolitana DC.; Hypochaeris salina Gren.; Hypochaeris tenorii Guss.; Leontodon ciliatus Scop.; Porcellites radicata (L.) Cass.; Seriola caespitosa Porta; Seriola taraxacifolia Salzm.

= Hypochaeris radicata =

Species of flowering plant

Hypochaeris radicata, phonetically hy-poh-KAIR-iss rad-ee-KAY-tuh, is sometimes spelled Hypochoeris radicata and known as catsear, flatweed, cat's-ear, hairy cat's ear, or false dandelion. It is a perennial, low-lying edible herb often found in lawns. H. radicata has been used for both food and medinicinal purposes.

The plant is native to Europe, but has also been introduced to the Americas, Japan, Australia, and New Zealand, where it can be an invasive weed. It is listed as a harmful, noxious weed by the Korean Ministry of Environment and in the northwestern U.S. state of Washington.

== Botany ==
The leaves, which may grow up to eight inches (20 cm) long, are lobed and covered in coarse hairs, forming a low-lying rosette around a central taproot. Forked stems carry bright yellow flower heads, and when mature these form seeds attached to windborne "parachutes". All parts of the plant exude a milky sap when cut.

Like other members of the Hypochaeris genus, its capitula's ray florets cycle, opening during daylight for pollination or seed dispersal, then close by nightfall. Some contend the opening of catsear's capitula is triggered by at least one–hour of bright sunlight (Percival, 1950); others claim dull and cloudy daylight is sufficient (Salisbury, 1964). The capitula remain open for 3–7 hours a day based on weather; shorter times during warmer periods, longer when cool and cloudy. Its inflorescences remain closed during rainy conditions.

The perennial plants remain a basal rosette during their first year, flowering initiating in the second annum. Mature plants live up to 10 years, flowering from spring to fall, plants producing nominally 2,300, but as many as 6,000 seeds per year. Mowing (or grazing) stimulates growth of additional flower stems, doubling their count, increasing flower (and seed) production. Seed viability is limited, less than a year; moist soil and light are required for germination. Dispersed achene is supported and carried by its feathery pappus with 95% of the seeds launched by a 27 miles (43 kilometers)/hr wind traveling at least 33 feet (10 m) from the parent plant before ground-fall, some known to reach 330 feet (100 m) (Soons et al. 2004).

H. radicata can also reproduce vegetatively via perennating buds in multi-crowned plants. When stressed from heavy grazing or mowing, the rootstock crown produces additional tap-roots enabling vegetative spread. The plant's ground level splitting, cloning, is presumably initiated by preferential growth conditions between the competing crown sections, e.g. a localized pest or disease, or an inferior substratum (MacDonald and Cavers, 1974).

The annual appearance of a second plant generation is common, observed in higher latitude biomes, e.g. British Columbia.

== Taxonomy ==
=== Species ===
Hypochaeris radicata was first documented in Carl Linnaeus' 1753 Species Plantarum.

=== Synonyms ===
Hypochaeris radicata has several synonyms, e.g.:

- Hypochaeris radicata var. brevis Murr
- Hypochaeris radicata var. erostris Emb. & Maire
- Hypochaeris radicata var. rostrata Moris
- Hypochaeris radicata var. subalpina (Schur) Nyár
- Hypochaeris radicata var. salina (Gren.) Rouy
- Hypochaeris radicata var. setulosa Maire & Sennen

=== Varieties ===
Hypochaeris radicata has 8 known subspecies:

- H. radicata subsp. ericetorum Soest
- H. radicata subsp. glabra (L.) Mateo & Figuerola, a short-lived hybrid produced from Hypochaeris glabra cross-breeding.
- H. radicata subsp. heterocarpa (Moris) Arcang.
- H. radicata subsp. hispida Peterm., a British Columbia distribution having a single row of bristles on its involucral bracts' keels
- H. radicata subsp. neapolitana Nyman, Central Mediterranean distribution having achene dimorphism with a separate phylogenetic lineage
- H. radicata subsp. platylepis (Boiss.) Jahand. & Maire; NW Africa, SW Spain, Italy and Greece, having distinct achene dimorphisms
- H. radicata subsp. radicata, the common form, found introduced worldwide
- H. radicata subsp. rocinensis M.Á.Ortiz & Talavera, distribution limited to the Doñana region of SW Spain, having unique stoloniferous propagation

=== Etymology and differences from dandelions ===
Hypochaeris radicata's genus, Hypochaeris or Hypochoeris, is derived from Greek ὑπό 'under' and χοῖρος for 'a young pig', being its preferred food source. Its species, radicata, means "with large, conspicuous roots" in Latin (derived from radix 'root').

Catsear is also known as false dandelion, commonly mistaken for true dandelions (Taraxacum). Both carry similar flowers which form windborne seeds. However, catsear flowering stems are forked and solid, whereas dandelions possess unforked, hollow stems (peduncles). Both plants have a rosette of leaves and a central taproot. The leaves of dandelions are jagged in appearance, whereas those of catsear are more lobe-shaped and hairy. The plants have similar uses.

H. radicata is also misidentified as autumn hawkbit (Scorzoneroides autumnalis) and smooth cat's ear (Hypochaeris glabra) due to similarity of their bright yellow flowers, the higher density of short, stiff hairs on its leaves being a distinguishing characteristic.

=== Common names ===
- Almeirão-roseta (Brazil)
- 假蒲公英猫儿菊 Jia pu gong ying mao er ju (Chinese)
- Biggenkruid (Dutch)
- Catsear, Australian Cape Weed, California Dandelion (English)
- Porcelle enracinée (French)
- Gewöhnliches Ferkelkraut (German)
- Παχιές (Greek, Modern)
- Costolina giuncolina (Italian)
- Butana (ブタナ) (or) tanpopomodoki (タンポポモドキ) (Japanese)
- 서양금혼초 (Korean)
- kystgrisøyre (Nynorsk, Norwegian)
- Almeirao-do-campo (or) dente-de-leão (Portuguese)
- Achicoria (or) hierba de halcon (Spanish)
- Rotfibbla (Swedish)

== Distribution and habitat ==
H. radicata is native from Europe to Caucasus, and in North Africa. It has been introduced in S and SE Asia, Australia, New Zealand, Japan, Pacific islands, S and SE Africa, and North and South America. Its range has been reported from Tasmania, 42°S Lat., to Scandinavia, near 63°N; at elevations from sea-level to 1,676 meters (5,499 ft) in Colorado and 4,500 meters (14,800 ft) in Columbia's Andean Mountain Range.

== Ecology ==
Hypochaeris radicata is considered a "nonhydrophyte" in the 2013 (US) National Wetland Plant List due to its preference for dryer upland soils. Dependent upon region, it may be found in wetlands, but not typically common. Catsear can become a problematic weed, but does provide beneficial wildlife forage.

=== Pests and diseases ===
- Parasites: Broomrape (Orobanche minor), a holoparasite plant, has invaded H. radicata in Canada and the dense foliage of H. radicata's basal rosette is known to harbor slugs, detrimental to other flora.
- Insects and nematodes: H. radicata's asteraceae family is used as a food source by larvae of some lepidoptera species including the shark moth, feeding on its flowers and leaves. H. radicata is known to be afflicted by soil-born stem nematodes (ditylenchus dipsaci); gall midges (contarinia hypochoeridis); cynipid wasps; and several weevils, e.g. the cribrate weevil (otiorhynchus cribricollis) and trachyphloeus scabriculus.
- Fungi: Parasitic fungi include Hawkweed rust (puccinia hieracii), causing microscopic spore-producing pustules on leaf surfaces, leading to their curling, withering; and Phymatotrichum omnivorum, a soil-born fungus causing root rot.
- Viruses: H. radicata is commonly affected by Hypochaeris Mosaic virus (HYMV00) in western Canada.

=== Ecological impact ===
H. radicata is a valuable plant for livestock and preferred by sheep and snowshoe hare over other food sources. Some have suggested its oversowing in grazed grasslands. Nutritionally, it is superior to many field grasses, comparable to white clover. Catsear's protein and mineral content measurably peak during spring and winter months. It has invaded the semi-barren soil of over-grazed, abandoned pastures, beneficially increasing the volume of green leafy forage.

H. radicata's ecological growth strategy is classified C-S-R, Competitor, Stress-tolerator and Ruderal, a formidable, adversarial combination. It can become a persistent weed in unwanted habitats. The species has invaded fragile ecosystems, habitat of rare and endangered plants. Its long leaves and dense rosette displace native annual species dependent upon accessible soil contact in open areas. It is classified as an invasive herbaceous weed in such locations. H. radicata's deep taproot draws and incorporates soil nitrogen, potentially reducing the residual nitrogen available for surrounding flora, stunting their growth. During the 1980s, it was accidentally introduced onto Jeju Island, a Korean Biosphere Reserve, and within 3 decades had become the dominant invasive plant. H. radicata seeds have been found as a contaminant in commercial seed products (Turkington and Aarssen 1983). Evidence from H. radicata's worldwide spread "strongly suggests" introduction via contamination of commercial crop and pasture seed mixes. H. radicata is found on almost all continents (Ortiz et al. 2008). It has been introduced into at least 40 countries or islands, being classified "invasive" in six; Argentina, Brazil, Japan, Republic of Korea, Mexico and Réunion; and as a "noxious specie" in Korea and Washington state.

Its prolific reproduction and deep roots enable aggressive growth in lawns, newly plowed fields, and commercial berry fields. It spreads by seed and if disturbed, by crown and root cuttings. Catsear successfully competes with other grassland species and is known to displace/destroy pasture lands within a 3-year period, even displacing preferred Trifolium repens (White Clover) stands. When applicable, it responds to common herbicides with the most effective outcome during the perennial's first growth year, its rosette stage, preceding flowering and dispersal. H. radicata is effectively controlled by plowing and cultivation.

== Culinary uses ==
All parts of the catsear plant are edible; however, the leaves and roots are those most often harvested. The leaves are bland in taste but can be eaten raw in salads, steamed, or used in stir-fries. Some recommend mixing them with other vegetables. Older leaves can become tough and fibrous, but younger leaves are suitable for consumption. In contrast to the edible leaves of dandelion, catsear leaves only rarely have some bitterness. In Crete, Greece, the leaves of a variety called παχιές (pachiés) or αγριοράδικα (agriorádika) are eaten boiled or steamed.

The root can be roasted and ground to form a coffee substitute.

== Toxicity ==
This species is associated with stringhalt in horses and donkeys if consumed in excess, the exact etiology unknown; otherwise non-poisonous and no contact dermatitis association.

== Gallery ==
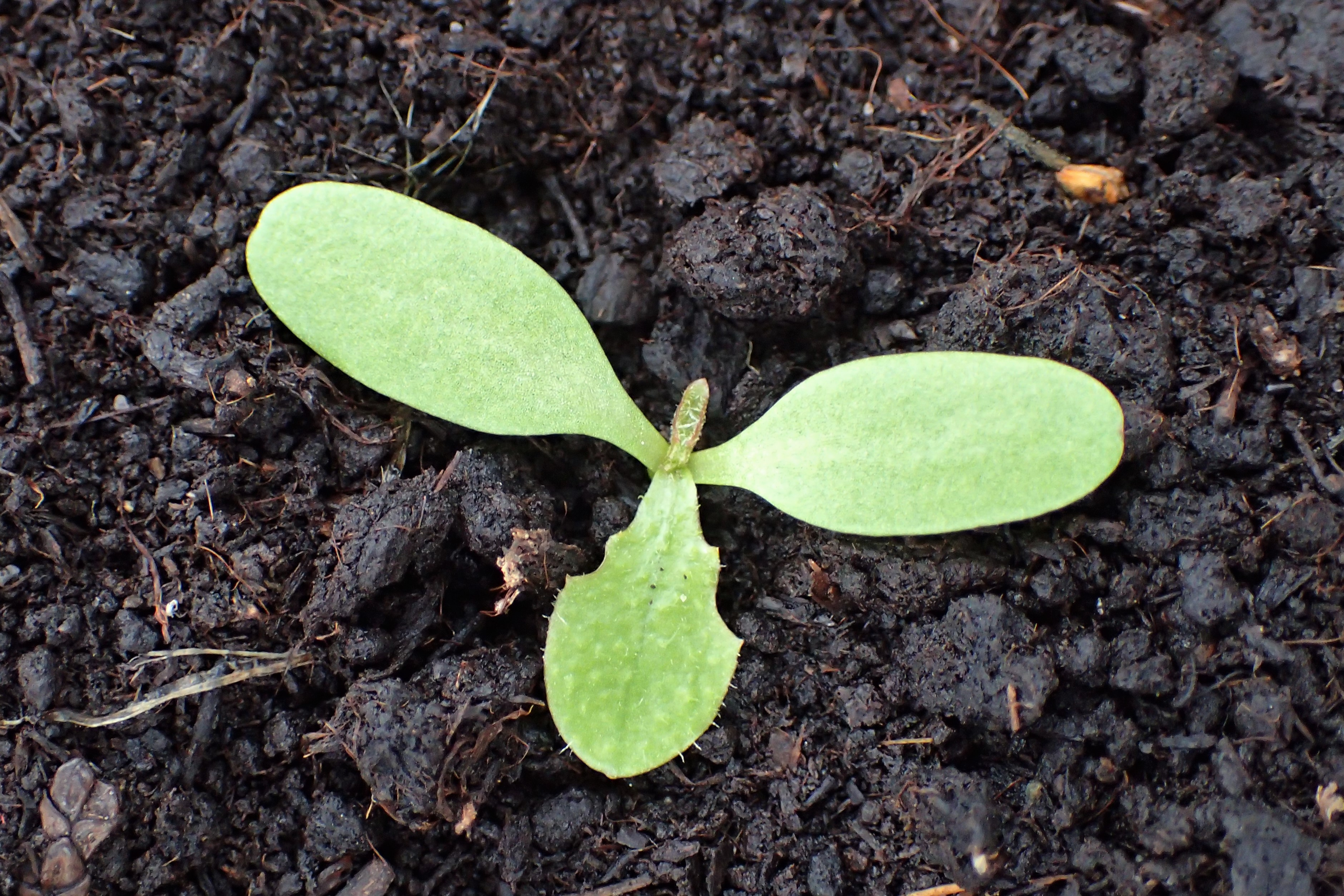
Hypochaeris radicata seedling

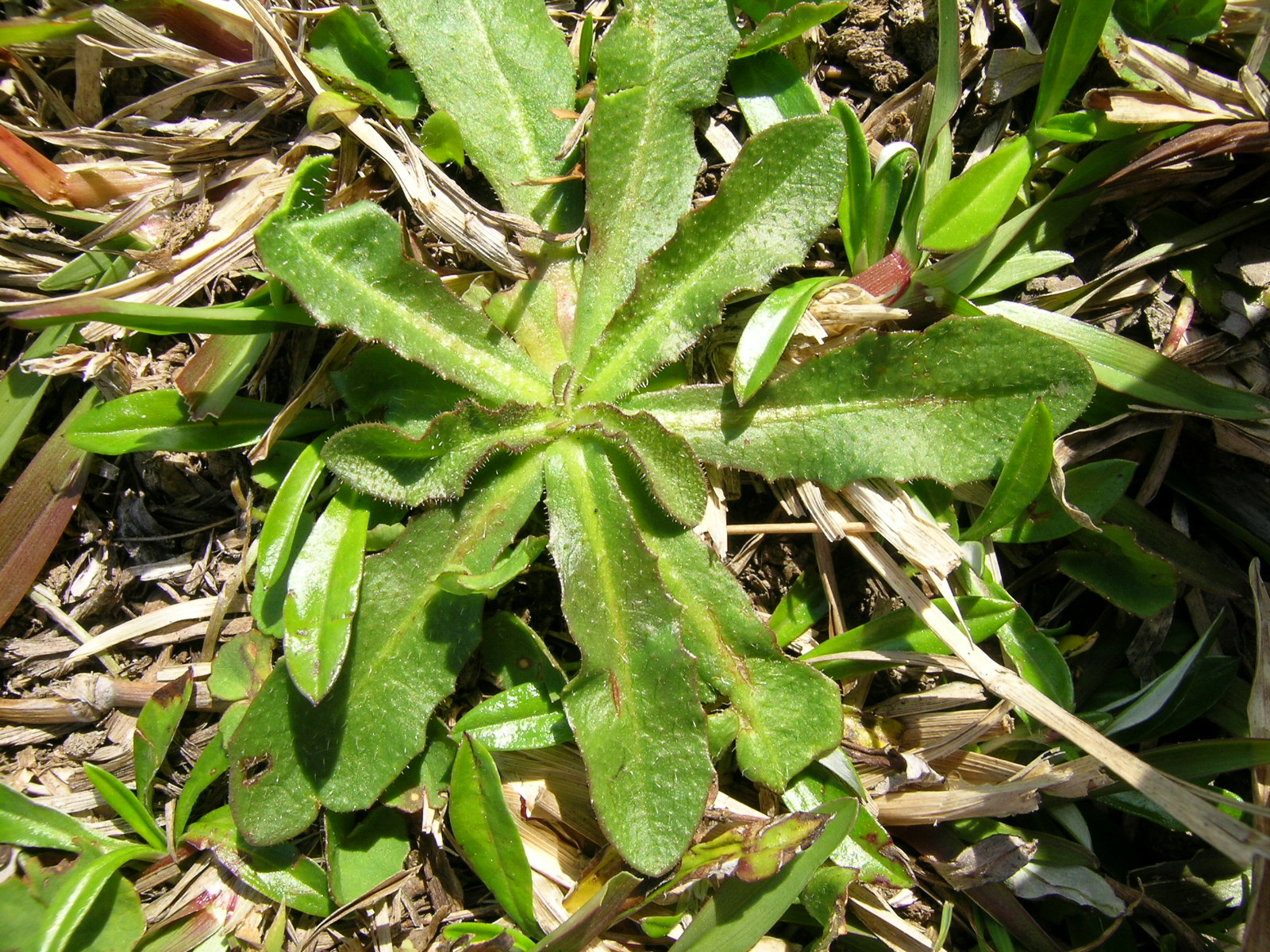
Cat's-ear first-year rosette

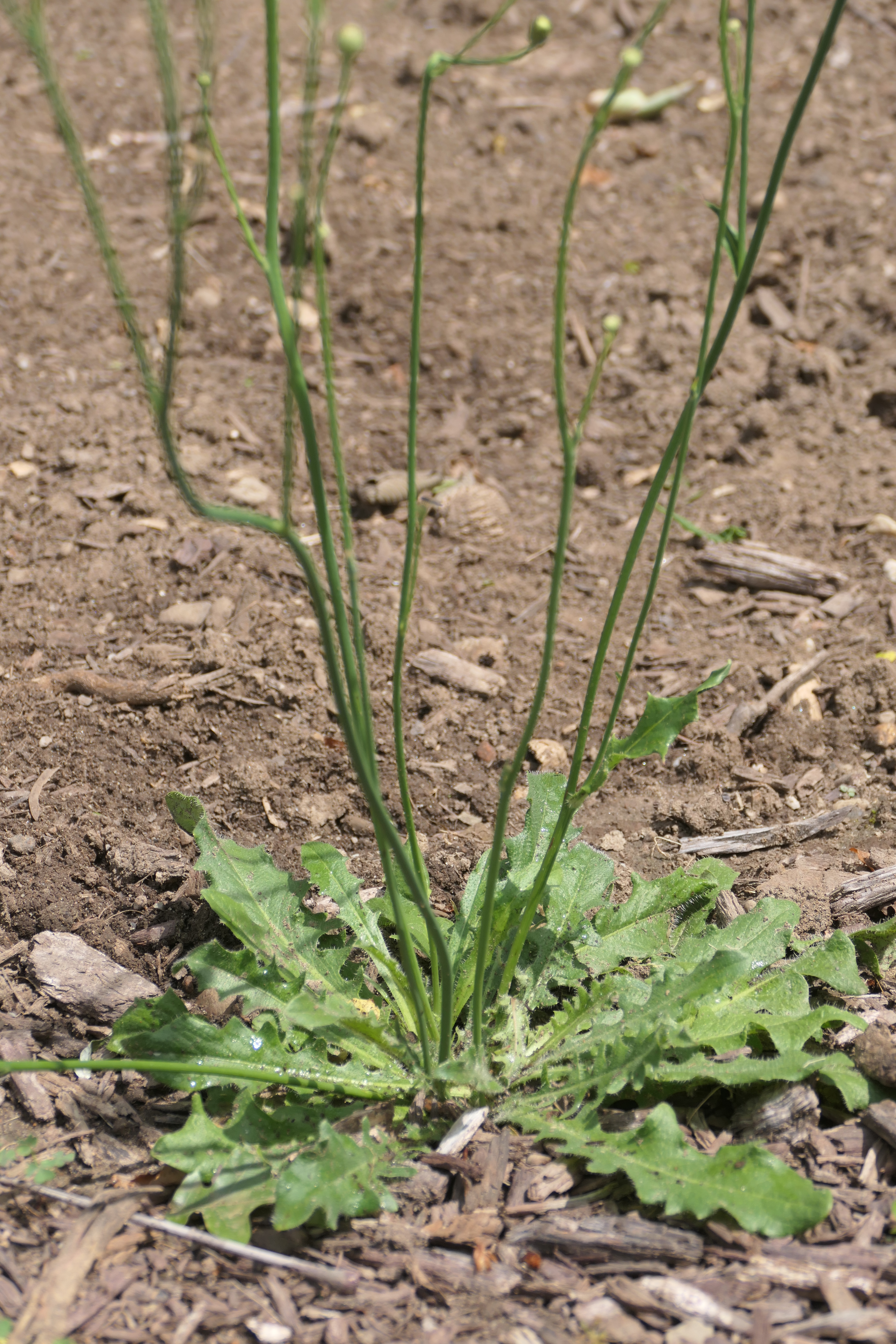
Flatweed rosette with branched stems

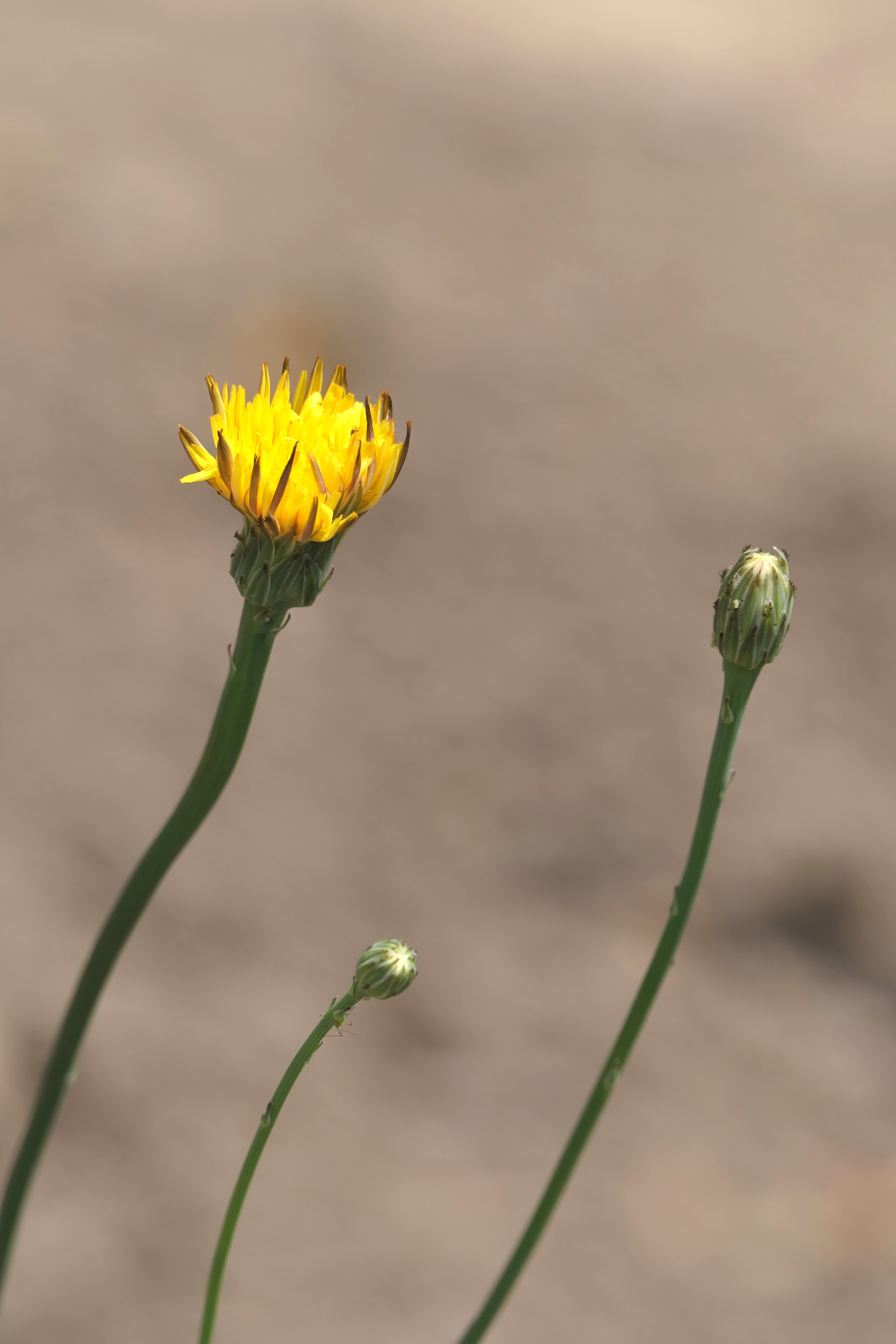
Cat's ear flower cycling open\closed in response to weather changes

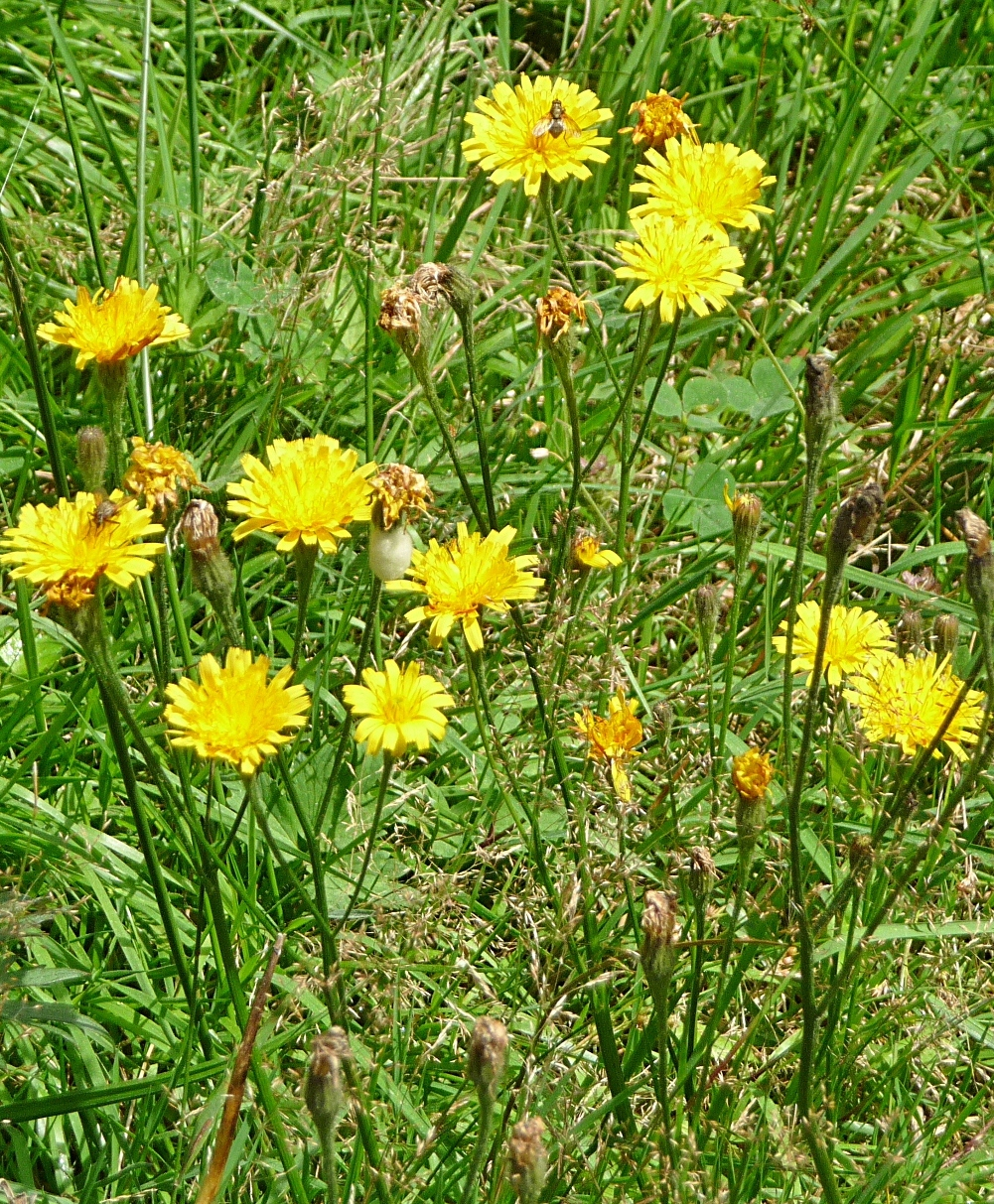
Hypochaeris radicata in bloom

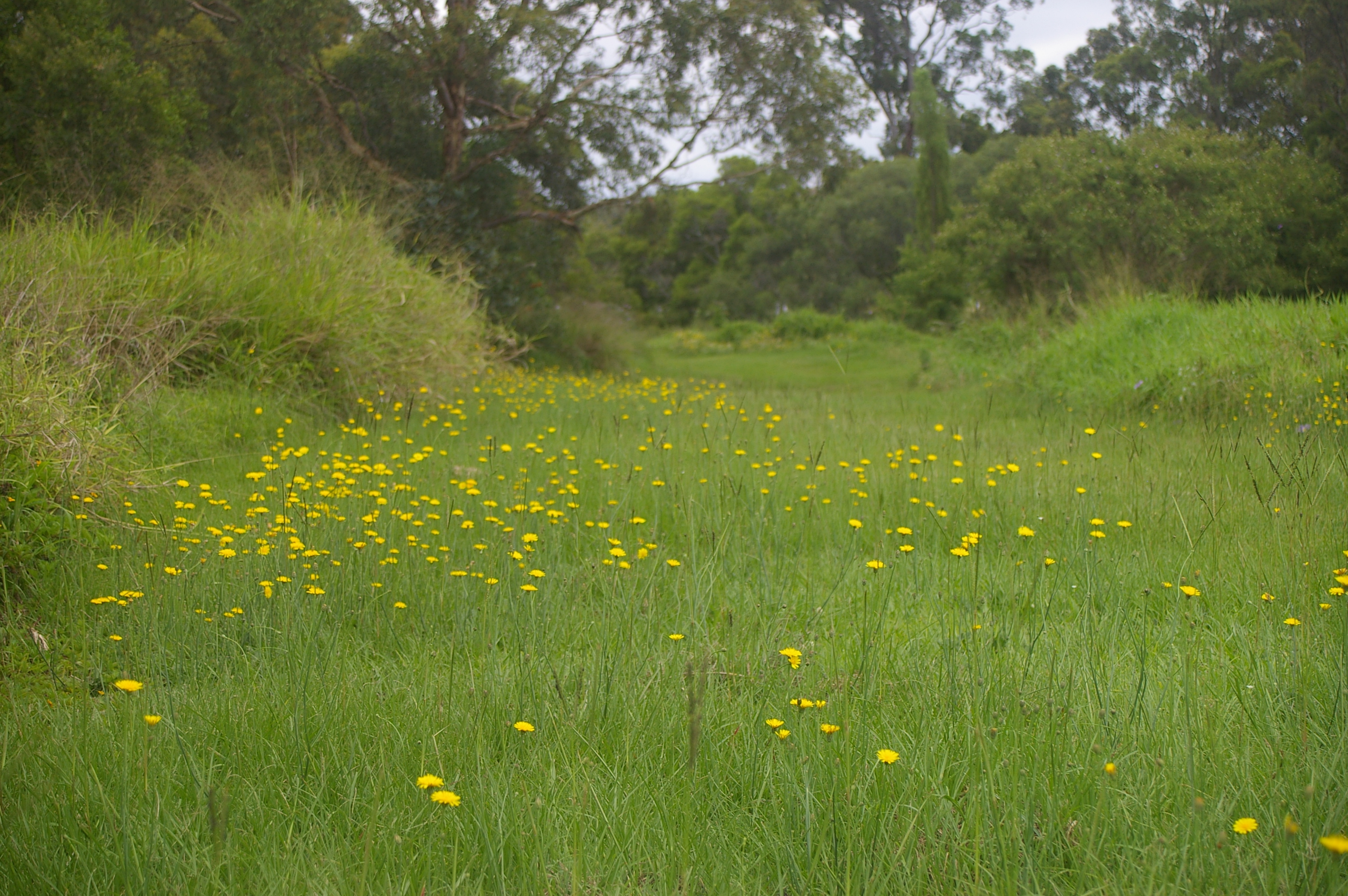
Invasive hypochaeris radicata in a Brisbane, Australia city park

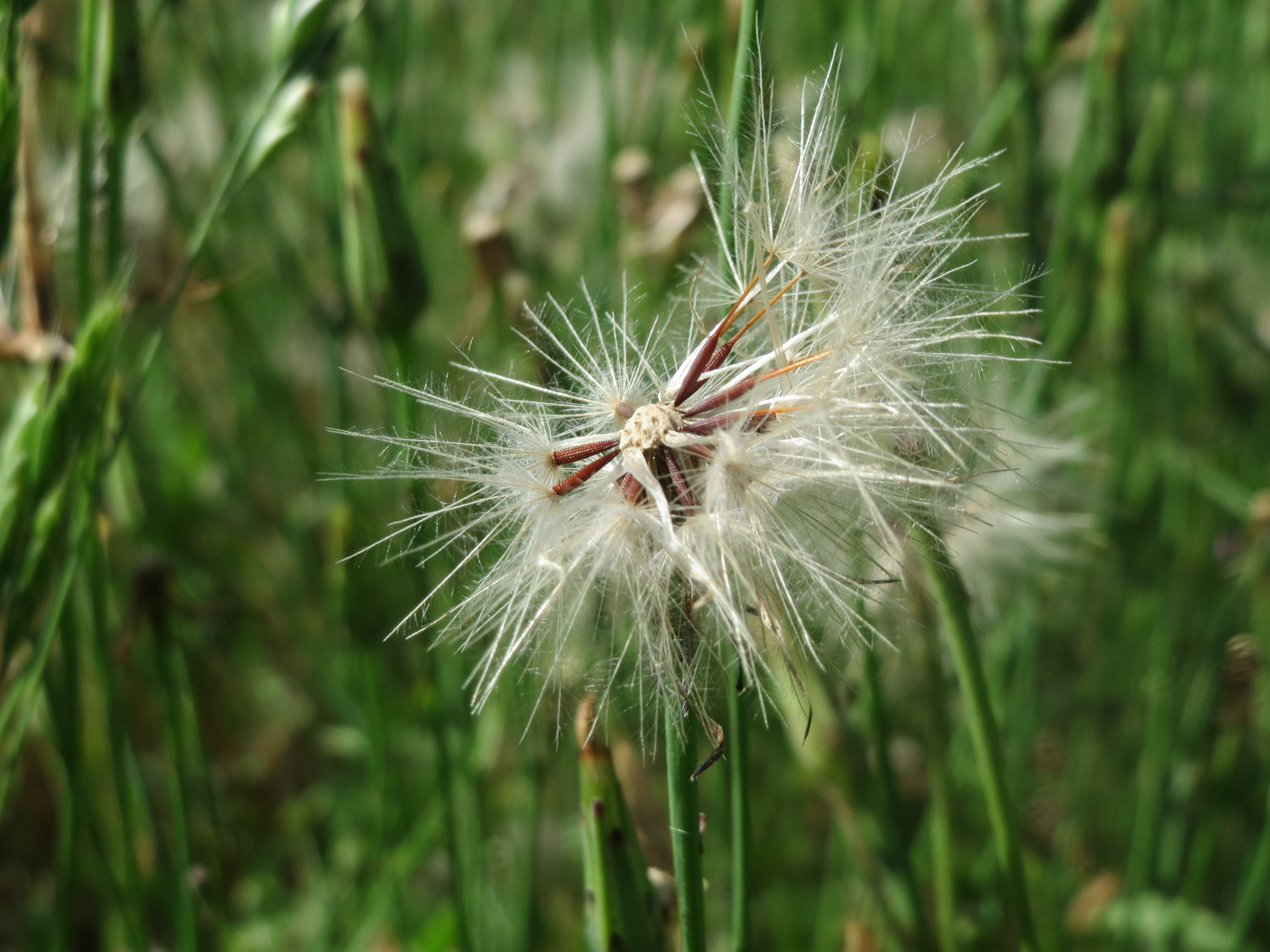
Hypochaeris radicata seed head

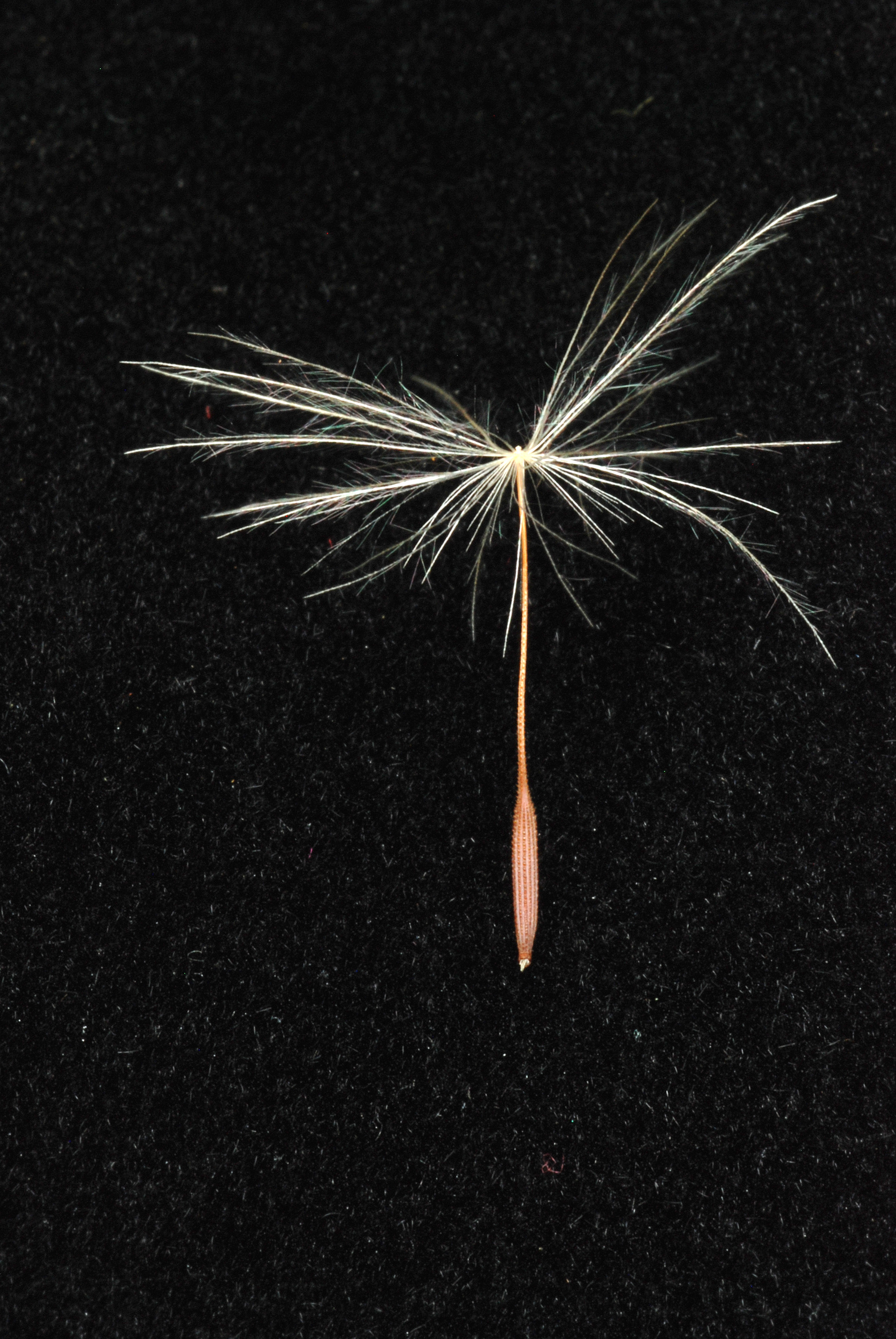
Hypochaeris radicata seed
