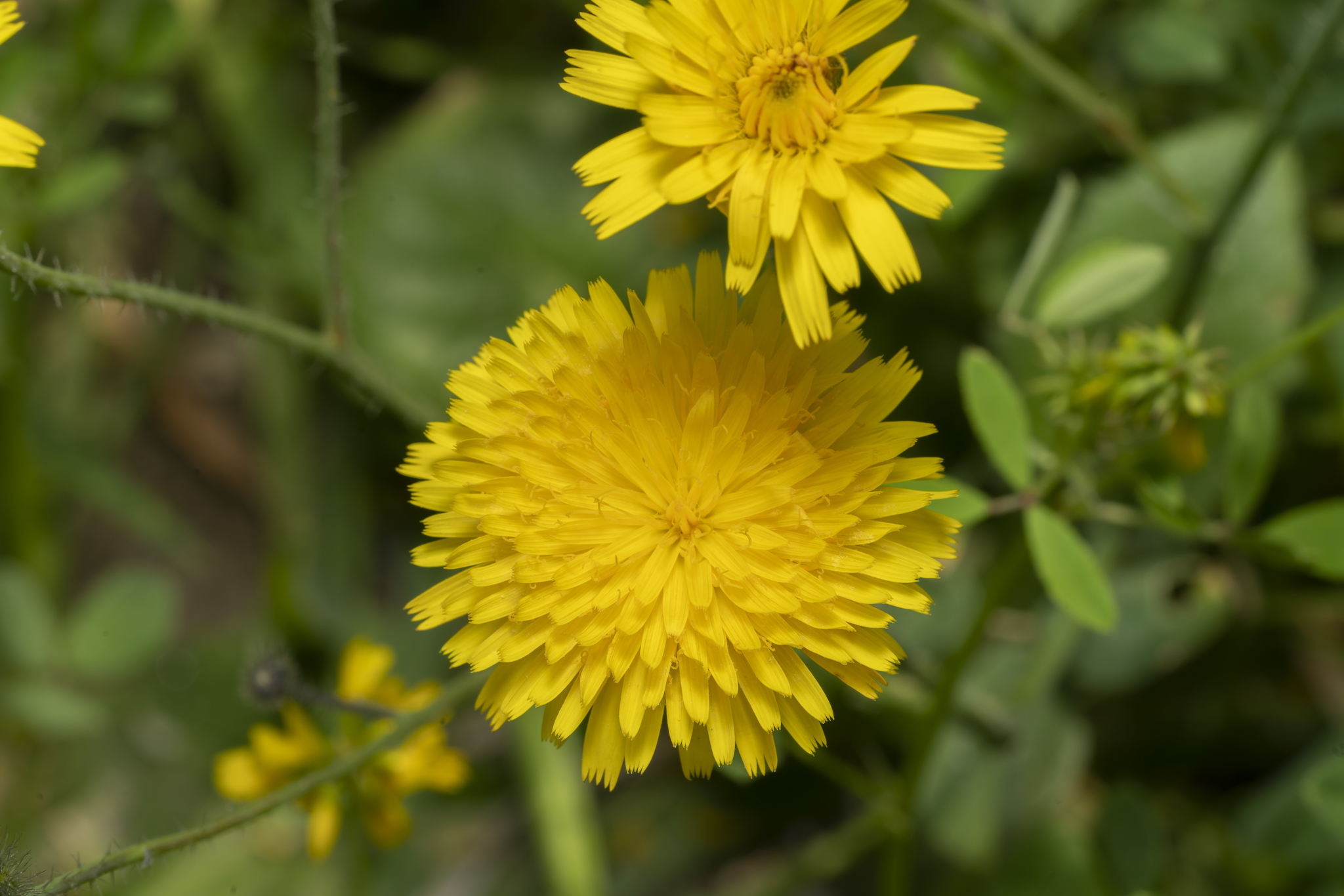

Scientific classification
- Kingdom: Plantae
- Clade: Tracheophytes
- Clade: Angiosperms
- Clade: Eudicots
- Clade: Asterids
- Order: Asterales
- Family: Asteraceae
- Genus: Hypochaeris
- Species: H. achyrophorus

Binomial name
- Hypochaeris achyrophorus L.

Synonyms
- Hedypnois aetnensis

= Hypochaeris achyrophorus =

Species of plant

Hypochaeris achyrophorus is a species of annual herb in the family Asteraceae. They have a self-supporting growth form. Individuals can grow to 17 cm tall.

== Sources ==
This article incorporates text from a free content work. Licensed under CC0 (license statement/permission). Text taken from Hypochoeris achyrophorus. Encyclopedia of Life.
