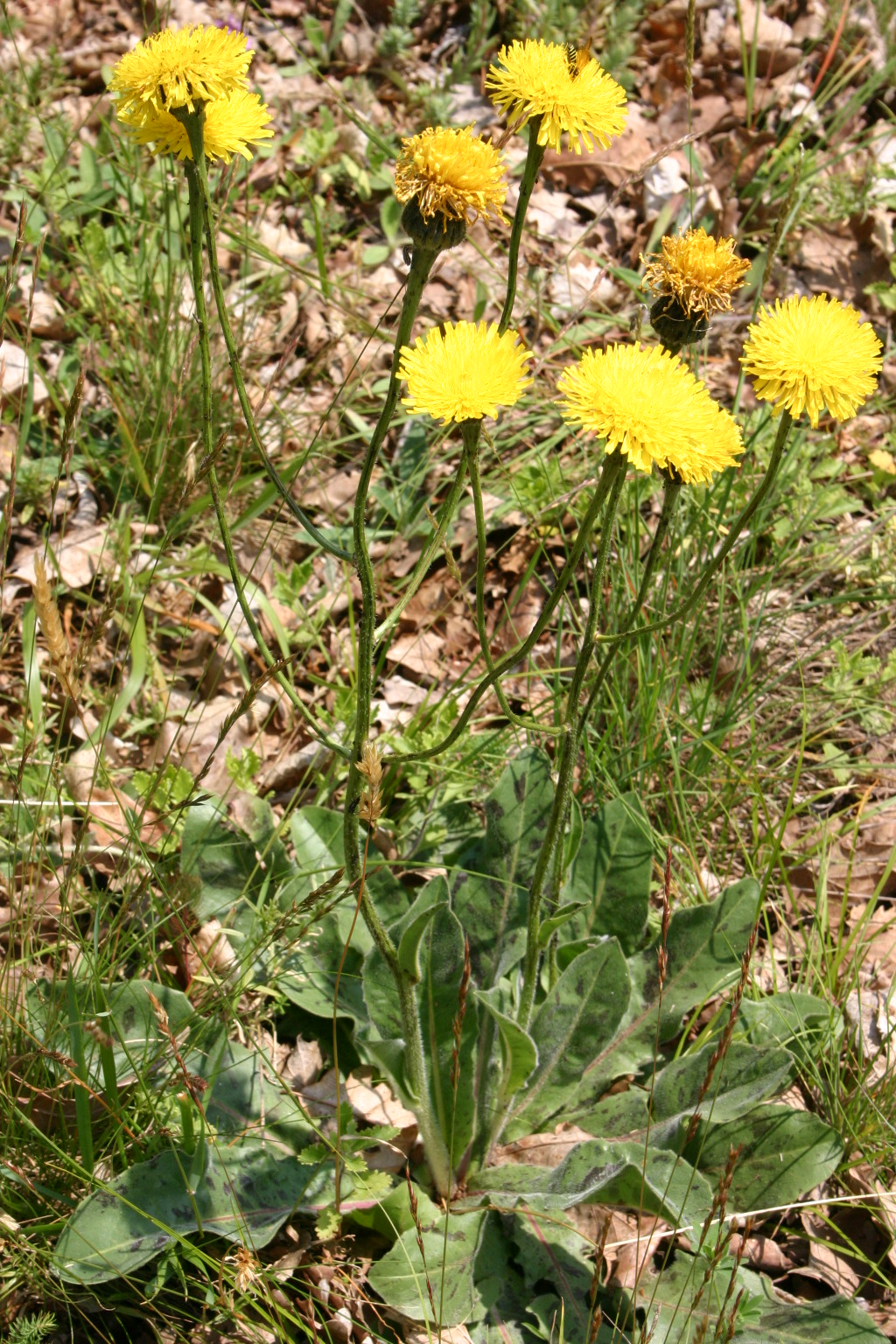

Scientific classification
- Kingdom: Plantae
- Clade: Tracheophytes
- Clade: Angiosperms
- Clade: Eudicots
- Clade: Asterids
- Order: Asterales
- Family: Asteraceae
- Genus: Hypochaeris
- Species: H. maculata

Binomial name
- Hypochaeris maculata L.

= Hypochaeris maculata =

Species of flowering plant

Hypochaeris maculata is a species of flowering plant belonging to the family Asteraceae, its common name is spotted cat's-ear.

Its native range is Europe to Siberia and China.

Synonym:

- Trommsdorffia maculata (L.) Bernh.
