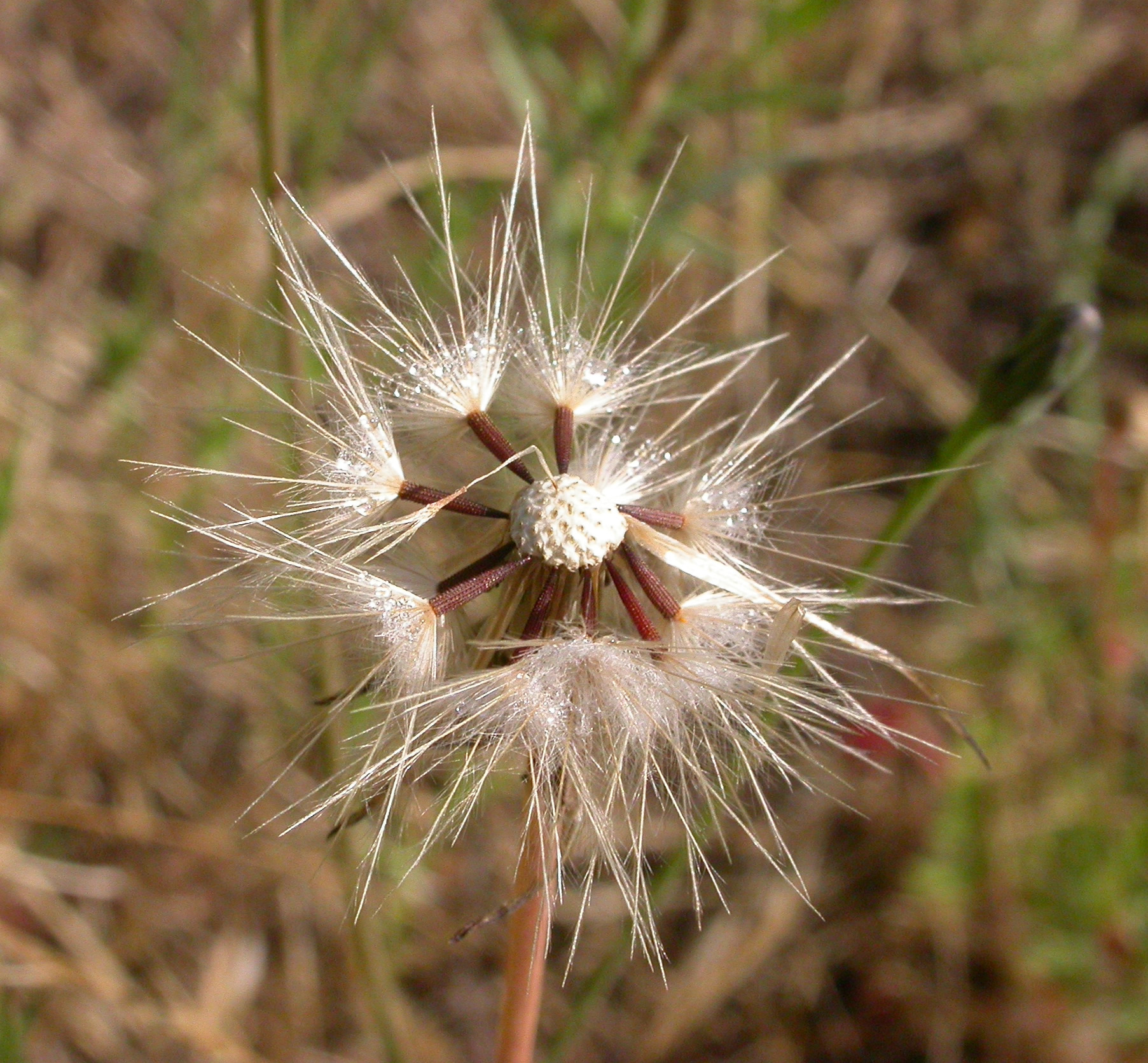
- Group of achenes with barbs

Scientific classification
- Kingdom: Plantae
- Clade: Tracheophytes
- Clade: Angiosperms
- Clade: Eudicots
- Clade: Asterids
- Order: Asterales
- Family: Asteraceae
- Genus: Hypochaeris
- Species: H. glabra

Binomial name
- Hypochaeris glabra L. 1753 not E.Mey. ex DC. 1838

Synonyms
- Synonymy: Achyrophorus balbisii Hornem.; Cycnoseris australis Endl.; Hedypnois glabra (L.) F.W.Schmidt; Hieracium adscendens Brot.; Hyoseris tenella Thunb.; Hypochaeris arachnites Link; Hypochaeris ascendens Brot.; Hypochaeris balbisii Rchb.; Hypochaeris balbisii Willd.; Hypochaeris balbisii Loisel.; Hypochaeris bartholdii Willd. ex Sch.Bip.; Hypochaeris candollei Regel; Hypochaeris capensis Less.; Hypochaeris contexta Wallr.; Hypochaeris dimorpha Brot.; Hypochaeris heterosperma Schult. ex Sch.Bip.; Hypochaeris hispida Roth; Hypochaeris intermedia Richt. ex Rchb.; Hypochaeris intertexta Peterm.; Hypochaeris minima Willd. ex d'Urv.; Hypochaeris minima Cirillo; Hypochaeris pumila Phil.; Hypochaeris pusilla Poir.; Hypochaeris simplex Mérat; Hypochaeris stellata Gaterau; Hypochaeris thracica Steven ex DC.; Podospermum taraxacifolium (Jacq.) Sweet; Scorzonera nova Desf. ex Walp.; Scorzonera taraxacifolia Jacq.

= Hypochaeris glabra =

Species of flowering plant

Hypochaeris glabra is a species of flowering plant in the tribe Cichorieae within the family Asteraceae known by the common name smooth cat's ear. It is native to Europe, North Africa, and the Middle East but it can be found on other continents where it is an introduced species and a widespread weed. It has become widespread in Africa, southern and southeastern Asia, Australia, and parts of the Americas (especially California).

Hypochaeris glabra is an annual herb growing a small taproot, a basal rosette of leaves, and one or more thin stems 10–40 cm (4–16 in) tall. The leaves are 2–10 cm (3/4–4 in) long, smooth along the edges or with small lobes, and green in color, sometimes with a purplish tint near the veins. Atop the thin, naked stems are flower heads with small overlapping purple-tipped phyllaries and bright yellow ray florets. The fruit is a cylindrical achene with a white pappus almost 1 cm (3/8 in) long.
