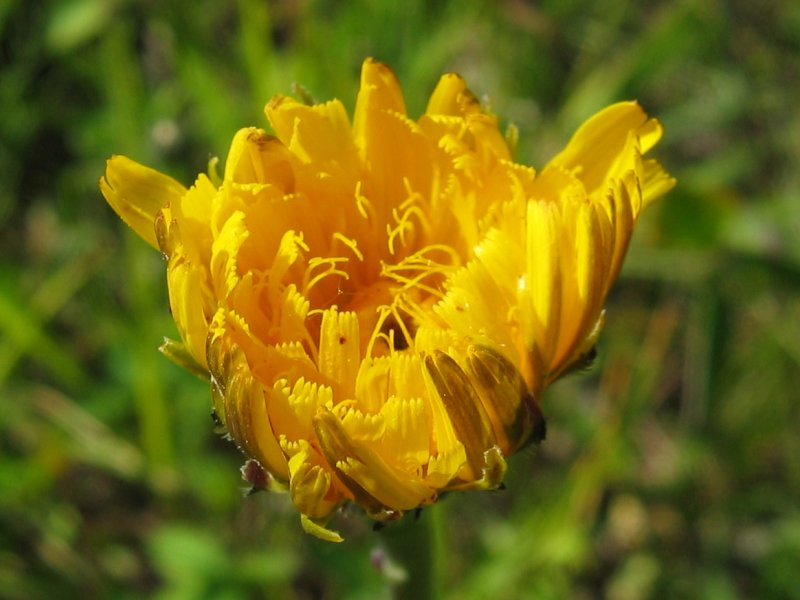
- Hypochaeris radicata

Scientific classification
- Kingdom: Plantae
- Clade: Embryophytes
- Clade: Tracheophytes
- Clade: Angiosperms
- Clade: Eudicots
- Clade: Asterids
- Order: Asterales
- Family: Asteraceae
- Subfamily: Cichorioideae
- Tribe: Cichorieae
- Subtribe: Hypochaeridinae
- Genus: Hypochaeris; L.

Type species
- Hypochaeris glabra L.

Synonyms
- Hypochoeris L. – common but nonpreferred spelling; Oreophila D.Don.; Seriola L.; Amblachaenium Turcz. ex DC.; Heywoodiella Svent. & Bramwell; Achyrophorus Adans.; Arachnospermum Berg.; Metabasis DC.; Achyrophorus Vaill.; Distoecha Phil.; Trommsdorffia Bernh.; Robertia A.Rich. ex DC.; Fabera Sch.Bip.; Porcellites Cass.; Cycnoseris Endl.; Piptopogon Cass.; Agenora D.Don

= Hypochaeris =

Genus of flowering plants

Hypochaeris is a genus of plants in the family Asteraceae. Many species are known as cat's ear. These are annual and perennial herbs generally bearing flower heads with yellow ray florets. These plants may resemble or be confused with dandelions and so some are called false dandelions.

Estimates of the number of species range from about 50 up to about 100. Most species are native to South America, but some are found in Eurasia and North Africa.

== Etymology ==
Its name is derived from Greek ὑπό (under) and χοῖρος (young pig).

== Species ==
Species

- Hypochaeris acaulis
- Hypochaeris achyrophorus
- Hypochaeris alba
- Hypochaeris albiflora
- Hypochaeris angustifolia
- Hypochaeris apargioides
- Hypochaeris arachnoides
- Hypochaeris arenaria
- Hypochaeris atlantica
- Hypochaeris balbisii
- Hypochaeris brasiliensis
- Hypochaeris caespitosa
- Hypochaeris catharinensis
- Hypochaeris chillensis
- Hypochaeris chondrilloides
- Hypochaeris chubutensis
- Hypochaeris ciliata
- Hypochaeris clarionoides
- Hypochaeris claryi
- Hypochaeris confusa
- Hypochaeris crepidioides
- Hypochaeris cretensis
- Hypochaeris cupressorum
- Hypochaeris deserticola
- Hypochaeris dolosa
- Hypochaeris dubia
- Hypochaeris echegarayi
- Hypochaeris elata
- Hypochaeris erecta
- Hypochaeris eremophila
- Hypochaeris eriolaena
- Hypochaeris foliosa
- Hypochaeris gayana
- Hypochaeris glabra
- Hypochaeris glabrata
- Hypochaeris graminea
- Hypochaeris grandidentata
- Hypochaeris grandiflorus
- Hypochaeris grisebachii
- Hypochaeris helvetica
- Hypochaeris hirta
- Hypochaeris hispidula
- Hypochaeris hohenackeri
- Hypochaeris incana
- Hypochaeris jussieui
- Hypochaeris laciniosa
- Hypochaeris leontodontoides
- Hypochaeris lessingii
- Hypochaeris linearifolia
- Hypochaeris lutea
- Hypochaeris maculata
- Hypochaeris magellanica
- Hypochaeris megapotamica
- Hypochaeris melanolepis
- Hypochaeris meyeniana
- Hypochaeris microcephala
- Hypochaeris montana
- Hypochaeris mucida
- Hypochaeris nahuelvutae
- Hypochaeris neopinnatifida
- Hypochaeris oligocephala
- Hypochaeris palustris
- Hypochaeris pampasica
- Hypochaeris parvifolia
- Hypochaeris patagonica
- Hypochaeris petiolaris
- Hypochaeris pilosa
- Hypochaeris procumbens
- Hypochaeris radiata
- Hypochaeris radicata
- Hypochaeris robertia
- Hypochaeris rutea
- Hypochaeris saldensis
- Hypochaeris salzmanniana
- Hypochaeris schizoglossa
- Hypochaeris scorzonerae
- Hypochaeris serioloides
- Hypochaeris sessiliflora
- Hypochaeris setosa
- Hypochaeris shermanum
- Hypochaeris sichorioides
- Hypochaeris soratensis
- Hypochaeris spathulata
- Hypochaeris taraxacoides
- Hypochaeris tenerifolia
- Hypochaeris tenuiflora
- Hypochaeris tenuifolia
- Hypochaeris thermarum
- Hypochaeris thrincioides
- Hypochaeris toltensis
- Hypochaeris tropicalis
- Hypochaeris uniflora
- Hypochaeris variegata
- Hypochaeris webbii

== Other sources ==
- Cerbah, M; T Souza-Chies; MF Jubier; B Lejeune; S Siljak-Yakovlev (March 1998). "Molecular phylogeny of the genus Hypochaeris using internal transcribed spacers of nuclear rDNA: inference for chromosomal evolution". Molecular Biology and Evolution. 15 (3): 345–354. doi:10.1093/oxfordjournals.molbev.a025931. PMID 9501501.
- Cerbah, M; J Coulaud; Sc Brown; S Siljak-Yakovlev (March 1999). "Evolutionary DNA variation in the genus Hypochaeris". Heredity. 82 (3): 261–266. doi:10.1038/sj.hdy.6884690. PMID 10336700.
