= List of Otiorhynchus species =

Otiorhynchus is the most speciose genus of weevils, comprising over 1500 species in more than 110 subgenera. Below is a list of these species, sorted alphabetially by subgenus.

== Subgenus Acunotus ==
- Otiorhynchus abbazzii Magnano, 1996 - Italy (Calabria, Tuscany)
- Otiorhynchus horridus Stierlin, 1880 - Croatia, Montenegro
- Otiorhynchus ligneoides Stierlin, 1902 - Italy (Basilicata)
- Otiorhynchus lutosus Stierlin, 1858 - France (mainland), Italy (mainland), Czech Republic, Slovenia, Croatia, Montenegro (?)
- Otiorhynchus pseudoligneoides Magnano, 1996 - Italy (Chieti)

== Subgenus Aequipennis ==
- Otiorhynchus aksekianus Magnano, 1977 - Turkey (Antalya)
- Otiorhynchus dorsogranatus Magnano, 2010 - Turkey, Lebanon
- Otiorhynchus sbordonii Smreczyński, 1977 - Turkey (?)
- Otiorhynchus spectativus Białooki, 2017 - Turkey (Antalya, Konya)

== Subgenus Aleutinops ==
- Otiorhynchus crepsensis J. Müller, 1922 - Croatia
- Otiorhynchus elegantulus Germar, 1823

== Subgenus Altaivagus ==
- Otiorhynchus unctuosus Germar, 1823

== Subgenus Amosilnus ==
- Otiorhynchus borshii Lona, 1922
- Otiorhynchus dauricus Stierlin, 1862
- Otiorhynchus fasciculatus Ménétriés, 1849
- Otiorhynchus grandineus Germar, 1823
- Otiorhynchus inductus Gyllenhal, 1834
- Otiorhynchus lavandus Germar, 1824
- Otiorhynchus midas Reitter, 1914
- Otiorhynchus oberti (Faust, 1887)
- Otiorhynchus pretiosus Stierlin, 1888
- Otiorhynchus simulans Stierlin, 1877
- Otiorhynchus subsignatus Gyllenhal, 1834
- Otiorhynchus trigradus Angelov, 1974

== Subgenus Anchorrhynchus ==
- Otiorhynchus beieri Penecke, 1935
- Otiorhynchus bischoffianus Lona, 1937
- Otiorhynchus cypricola Reiche, 1858 - Cyprus
- Otiorhynchus endroedi Angelov, 1964
- Otiorhynchus epiroticus Apfelbeck, 1901
- Otiorhynchus excellens Kirsch, 1880 - Greece (Peloponnese)
- Otiorhynchus lumensis Apfelbeck, 1908
- Otiorhynchus muellerorum Colonnelli, 2018 - Greece (Thassos Island)
- Otiorhynchus munelensis Apfelbeck, 1907
- Otiorhynchus parnassius Apfelbeck, 1922
- Otiorhynchus pelionis Penecke, 1924
- Otiorhynchus pseudalbanicus Braun, 1990
- Otiorhynchus pseudoschlaeflini Szénási, 2022
- Otiorhynchus roznerantii Szénási, 2022
- Otiorhynchus sabbadinii Pesarini, 1985
- Otiorhynchus schlaeflini Stierlin, 1861
- Otiorhynchus solariorum Lona, 1922
- Otiorhynchus subfilum Reitter, 1884

== Subgenus Arammichnus ==
- Otiorhynchus adrianus Baviera & Magnano, 2010
- Otiorhynchus aegatensis Magnano, 1992
- Otiorhynchus apulus A. Solari & F. Solari, 1913
- Otiorhynchus auladalinus Koch, 1936
- Otiorhynchus bagnoli Stierlin, 1901
- Otiorhynchus bullinii Magnano, 1992
- Otiorhynchus calabrensis Stierlin, 1891
- Otiorhynchus calabrolucanus Lona, 1958
- Otiorhynchus catinensis Magnano, 1993
- Otiorhynchus cerigensis Apfelbeck, 1922
- Otiorhynchus championi Reitter, 1912
- Otiorhynchus concavirostris Boheman, 1842
- Otiorhynchus convexicollis Stierlin, 1861
- Otiorhynchus cossyrensis Magnano, 1992
- Otiorhynchus cribricollis Gyllenhal, 1834
- Otiorhynchus echidna K. Daniel & J. Daniel, 1898
- Otiorhynchus ferdinandi Reitter, 1914
- Otiorhynchus ferrarii Miller, 1863
- Otiorhynchus fiorii Magnano, 1975
- Otiorhynchus flavimanus Stierlin, 1861
- Otiorhynchus gravidus Stierlin, 1872
- Otiorhynchus hellenicus Stierlin, 1872
- Otiorhynchus hyblaeicus Magnano, 1992
- Otiorhynchus hystrix Gyllenhal, 1834
- Otiorhynchus indefinitus Reitter, 1912 - Italy (mainland)
- Otiorhynchus italicus Stierlin, 1888
- Otiorhynchus juvencus Gyllenhal, 1834
- Otiorhynchus kochi F. Solari, 1940
- Otiorhynchus lacertosus Pesarini, 1975
- Otiorhynchus linussae A. Solari & F. Solari, 1922
- Otiorhynchus lopadusae A. Solari & F. Solari, 1922
- Otiorhynchus lubricus Boheman, 1842
- Otiorhynchus matutinus Reitter, 1912
- Otiorhynchus meligunensis Magnano, 1992
- Otiorhynchus moriger Reitter, 1914
- Otiorhynchus noesskei Apfelbeck, 1922
- Otiorhynchus ocellifer Reitter, 1912
- Otiorhynchus opimus Magnano, 1992
- Otiorhynchus ovatulus Boheman, 1842
- Otiorhynchus pelagosanus J. Müller, 1937
- Otiorhynchus poggii Di Marco, G. Osella & Zuppa, 2002
- Otiorhynchus proximophthalmus Reitter, 1914
- Otiorhynchus pseudohellenicus Magnano, 1993
- Otiorhynchus pseudosetosulus Baviera & Magnano, 2010
- Otiorhynchus pseudoumbilicatoides Magnano, 1993
- Otiorhynchus pulchellus Stierlin, 1861
- Otiorhynchus reticollis Boheman, 1842
- Otiorhynchus rigidesetosus Magnano, 1996
- Otiorhynchus scabrosoides Stierlin, 1877
- Otiorhynchus schembrii Magnano, 1992
- Otiorhynchus setosulus Stierlin, 1861
- Otiorhynchus striatosetosus Boheman, 1842
- Otiorhynchus sulcirostris Boheman, 1842
- Otiorhynchus torretassoi Koch, 1936
- Otiorhynchus tuscoinsularis Magnano, 1992
- Otiorhynchus umbilicatoides Reitter, 1912
- Otiorhynchus vagans Baviera & Magnano, 2010
- Otiorhynchus valdemosae (L.W. Schaufuss, 1882)
- Otiorhynchus villosus Stierlin, 1872
- Otiorhynchus volturinensis Magnano, 1999
- Otiorhynchus vulturensis Lona, 1931

== Subgenus Aranihus ==
- Otiorhynchus alluaudi Peyerimhoff, 1925
- Otiorhynchus almeriacus (Magnano, 2009)
- Otiorhynchus bialookii (Magnano, 2009)
- Otiorhynchus cobosi Hoffmann, 1957
- Otiorhynchus cobosorum Alonso-Zarazaga, 1984
- Otiorhynchus davidi Alonso-Zarazaga, 1984
- Otiorhynchus deceptorius Białooki, Germann & Pelletier, 2015
- Otiorhynchus decorus Stierlin, 1875
- Otiorhynchus faucium Colonnelli & Forbicioni, 2014
- Otiorhynchus felis Hustache, 1941
- Otiorhynchus frescati Boheman, 1842 - southern France, Italy, Austria, Bosnia & Herzegovina, Romania
- Otiorhynchus guttula Fairmaire, 1859
- Otiorhynchus incisirostris Białooki, Germann & Pelletier, 2017
- Otiorhynchus kaci (Peyerimhoff, 1908)
- Otiorhynchus ketamaensis Magnano & Germann, 2008
- Otiorhynchus kocheri A. Hoffmann, 1950
- Otiorhynchus lecerfi Hustache, 1941
- Otiorhynchus ligneus (Olivier, 1807)
- Otiorhynchus longiusculus Stierlin, 1888
- Otiorhynchus machadoi (Germann, 2004)
- Otiorhynchus maroccanus (Magnano, 2000)
- Otiorhynchus mesatlanticus Peyerimhoff, 1928
- Otiorhynchus misellus Stierlin, 1861
- Otiorhynchus naudinii P. H. Lucas, 1855
- Otiorhynchus nevadensis Stierlin, 1892
- Otiorhynchus parvicollis Gyllenhal, 1834
- Otiorhynchus paulinoi Stierlin, 1886
- Otiorhynchus rudis Stierlin, 1861
- Otiorhynchus schaeferi Hoffmann, 1961
- Otiorhynchus sordidus Stierlin, 1861
- Otiorhynchus spinipennis (Magnano, 2003)
- Otiorhynchus squamifer Boheman, 1842
- Otiorhynchus squamipes Reitter, 1913
- Otiorhynchus stuebeni Magnano, 2006 - Morocco (High Atlas)
- Otiorhynchus tenuicostis Hustache, 1920
- Otiorhynchus vaucheri Peyerimhoff, 1927
- Otiorhynchus venarum Colonnelli & Casalini, 2014
- Otiorhynchus villiersi Ruter, 1941
- Otiorhynchus vitellus Gyllenhal, 1834

== Subgenus Arnoldinus ==
- Otiorhynchus ceratoniae Davidian, L. Gültekin & Korotyaev, 2017 - Turkey (Antalya)
- Otiorhynchus microcornis Białooki, 2017 - Turkey (Konya)

== Subgenus Bytosmesus ==
- Otiorhynchus multicostatus Stierlin, 1861

== Subgenus Cavernodes ==
- Otiorhynchus arxfabae Magrini & Onnis, 2019
- Otiorhynchus beppeosellai Magrini, 2020
- Otiorhynchus cesarebelloi Magrini, 2020
- Otiorhynchus curviphallus Magrini & Fancello, 2021
- Otiorhynchus degiovannii Magrini & Consorti, 2005 - Italy (Sardinia)
- Otiorhynchus doderoi A. Solari & F. Solari, 1904 - Italy (Sardinia)
- Otiorhynchus grenieri (Allard, 1869) - France (Corsica)
- Otiorhynchus hyacinthae Magrini & Onnis, 2019
- Otiorhynchus monoecirupis Lemaire, Ponel & Alziar, 2012 - Monaco
- Otiorhynchus nicaeicivis (Gozis, 1895) - France (Alpes Maritimes)
- Otiorhynchus pavesii Magrini, Magnano & Abbazzi, 2007

== Subgenus Choilisanus ==
- Otiorhynchus affinis Hochhuth, 1847
- Otiorhynchus analemmus Białooki, 2016
- Otiorhynchus athosiensis Reitter, 1913
- Otiorhynchus aziziyensis Davidian & L. Gültekin, 2015
- Otiorhynchus balcanicus Stierlin, 1861 - Russia (Krasnodar Krai), southern Ukraine, Slovakia (?), Bulgaria, Greece, Turkey, Lebanon
- Otiorhynchus brunneiformis Białooki, 2018
- Otiorhynchus brunneus Gyllenhal, 1834
- Otiorhynchus constricticollis Stierlin, 1861
- Otiorhynchus convexipterus Białooki, 2015
- Otiorhynchus decussatus Hochhuth, 1851
- Otiorhynchus ege Davidian & L. Gültekin, 2015
- Otiorhynchus elegantinus Angelov, 1974
- Otiorhynchus formaneki Reitter, 1913
- Otiorhynchus glebius Davidian & Keskin, 2010
- Otiorhynchus grandicollis Boheman, 1842
- Otiorhynchus granicus Białooki, 2015 - Greece (Crete)
- Otiorhynchus granulatopunctatus Stierlin, 1883
- Otiorhynchus idhaeus Białooki, 2015
- Otiorhynchus imperspicabilis Białooki, 2016
- Otiorhynchus impetrativus Białooki, 2016
- Otiorhynchus inflatipes Białooki, 2015
- Otiorhynchus karadeniz Davidian & L. Gültekin, 2015
- Otiorhynchus laconicus Kirsch, 1880 - Greece (Peloponnese, Thessaly (?), Central Macedonia (?))
- Otiorhynchus latinasus Reitter, 1898
- Otiorhynchus lazorum Davidian & Savitsky, 2015
- Otiorhynchus leuthneri Smreczyński, 1977
- Otiorhynchus magnicollis Stierlin, 1888
- Otiorhynchus megapterygius Białooki, 2016
- Otiorhynchus megareoides Smreczyński, 1977
- Otiorhynchus megareus Reitter, 1913
- Otiorhynchus meledanus Reitter, 1900
- Otiorhynchus mogulonoides Białooki, 2018
- Otiorhynchus nigrescens Białooki, 2015
- Otiorhynchus octangularis Białooki, 2016
- Otiorhynchus pectorosus Białooki, 2016
- Otiorhynchus pelliceus Boheman, 1842
- Otiorhynchus petryszaki Mazur, 1983
- Otiorhynchus pilosus Gyllenhal, 1834 - Moldova, Ukraine, Russia (European Russia including the Caucasus), Turkey (Samsun, Kavak, Artvin)
- Otiorhynchus plagigerulus Białooki, 2016
- Otiorhynchus podlussanyorum Białooki, 2018
- Otiorhynchus pubifer Boheman, 1842
- Otiorhynchus pulverulus Boheman, 1842
- Otiorhynchus raucus (Fabricius, 1777)
- Otiorhynchus richteri Iablokoff-Khnzorian, 1959
- Otiorhynchus robustisetis Białooki, 2016
- Otiorhynchus sculptiventris Białooki, 2016
- Otiorhynchus sphaerosoma Apfelbeck, 1919
- Otiorhynchus strix Stierlin, 1891
- Otiorhynchus terrifer Stierlin, 1884
- Otiorhynchus theophrastus Białooki & Germann, 2016 - Greece (Lesbos Island)
- Otiorhynchus thermophilus Białooki, 2016
- Otiorhynchus tournierioides Apfelbeck, 1932
- Otiorhynchus tuberculifer Białooki, 2015
- Otiorhynchus umbraticus Białooki, 2016
- Otiorhynchus valerii Davidian & Savitsky, 2015
- Otiorhynchus velutinus Germar, 1823
- Otiorhynchus weisei Reitter, 1895
- Otiorhynchus zhantievi Korotyaev, 1992

== Subgenus Clypeotiorhynchus ==
- Otiorhynchus avtandili Davidian & Yunakov, 2002
- Otiorhynchus costulatus Formánek, 1922
- Otiorhynchus gracilipes Reitter, 1895

== Subgenus Commagenus ==
- Otiorhynchus svetlanae Davidian, 2024 - Turkey (Adıyaman)

== Subgenus Crataegodes ==
- Otiorhynchus crataegi Germar, 1823 - Europe, Georgia (Abkhazia), introduced to the United States (Washington, Oregon, Massachusetts, Rhode Island, Connecticut, New York, Pennsylvania, Georgia) and Canada (British Columbia)

== Subgenus Cryphiphoroides ==
- Otiorhynchus galteri Apfelbeck, 1918
- Otiorhynchus ganglbaueri Stierlin, 1888
- Otiorhynchus imitator Apfelbeck, 1896
- Otiorhynchus korabensis Lona, 1943
- Otiorhynchus koritnicensis Apfelbeck, 1919
- Otiorhynchus mendax Apfelbeck, 1918
- Otiorhynchus molytoides Reitter, 1901
- Otiorhynchus solitarius Apfelbeck, 1919
- Otiorhynchus titan Apfelbeck, 1907

== Subgenus Cryphiphorus ==
- Otiorhynchus concors F. Solari, 1932
- Otiorhynchus convexiusculus F. Solari, 1932
- Otiorhynchus depressipennis F. Solari, 1932
- Otiorhynchus dubitabilis Fairmaire, 1866
- Otiorhynchus griseolus F. Solari, 1932
- Otiorhynchus ligustici (Linnaeus, 1758)
- Otiorhynchus ligusticiformis Formánek, 1926
- Otiorhynchus mancinii F. Solari, 1932
- Otiorhynchus nemorosus Iablokoff-Khnzorian, 1984
- Otiorhynchus pindicus F. Solari, 1932
- Otiorhynchus subaequivestis F. Solari, 1932
- Otiorhynchus subcontractus F. Solari, 1932
- Otiorhynchus subrotundatus Stierlin, 1875
- Otiorhynchus subseriatus F. Solari, 1932
- Otiorhynchus turbator F. Solari, 1932

== Subgenus Davidianaxius ==
- Otiorhynchus fulliformis Reitter, 1914
- Otiorhynchus korgei Smreczyński, 1971 - Turkey (Tunceli)
- Otiorhynchus pastoralis Davidian & Savitsky, 2005
- Otiorhynchus pawlowskii Mazur, 1983 - northeastern Turkey
- Otiorhynchus ptochoides Reitter, 1895
- Otiorhynchus pulvinatus Hochhuth, 1847
- Otiorhynchus schelkovnikovi Davidian & Savitsky, 2005
- Otiorhynchus sieversi Faust, 1888 - Georgia, Armenia, Azerbaijan, Iran

== Subgenus Delenegus ==
- Otiorhynchus laurenti Normand, 1953
- Otiorhynchus tuniseus Pic, 1909
- Otiorhynchus vaulogeri Pic, 1900

== Subgenus Dibredus ==
- Otiorhynchus faldermanni Hochhuth, 1847
- Otiorhynchus fausti Stierlin, 1875
- Otiorhynchus foveicollis Hochhuth, 1847
- Otiorhynchus laeviusculus Stierlin, 1861
- Otiorhynchus lucidicollis Smreczyński, 1970
- Otiorhynchus nemrutensis Białooki, 2015
- Otiorhynchus nudiformis Reitter, 1914
- Otiorhynchus ortrudheinzae Braun, 1991
- Otiorhynchus phreatus Reitter, 1914
- Otiorhynchus ponticus Stierlin, 1872
- Otiorhynchus rufimanus Hochhuth, 1851
- Otiorhynchus schuberti Davidian, 2016

== Subgenus Ditrichosomus ==
- Otiorhynchus improbus Arnoldi, 1975

== Subgenus Dorymerus ==
- Otiorhynchus picenus G. Osella & Zuppa, 1994 - Italy (Marche)
- Otiorhynchus raffrayanus F. Solari, 1940
- Otiorhynchus strigirostris Boheman,1843 - Italy (mainland)
- Otiorhynchus sulcatus (Fabricius, 1775)
- Otiorhynchus vignai G. Osella & Zuppa, 1994 - Italy (Abruzzo, Molise)

== Subgenus Duphanastus ==
- Otiorhynchus apfelbecki Stierlin, 1887
- Otiorhynchus auricomus Germar, 1823
- Otiorhynchus aurosparsus Germar, 1823
- Otiorhynchus burlinii F. Solari, 1947
- Otiorhynchus eremicola Rosenhauer, 1847
- Otiorhynchus fraxini Germar, 1823
- Otiorhynchus subquadratus Rosenhauer, 1847

== Subgenus Edelengus ==
- Otiorhynchus allardi Stierlin, 1872
- Otiorhynchus annibali Stierlin, 1872
- Otiorhynchus atlasicus Escalera, 1914
- Otiorhynchus augusti Magnano, 2001
- Otiorhynchus cirtensis Magnano, 2008
- Otiorhynchus dyris Peyerimhoff, 1925
- Otiorhynchus edelenginus Reitter, 1913
- Otiorhynchus gastonis Fairmaire, 1867
- Otiorhynchus intrusicollis Rosenhauer, 1856
- Otiorhynchus jendoubensis Magnano, 2008
- Otiorhynchus nitidiventris Fairmaire, 1884
- Otiorhynchus pittinoi Magnano & Pesarini, 2001
- Otiorhynchus planithorax Boheman, 1842
- Otiorhynchus pseudannibali Magnano, 2001
- Otiorhynchus scobinatus A. Solari & F. Solari, 1905
- Otiorhynchus tornezyi (Peyerimhoff, 1922)

== Subgenus Elechranus ==
- Otiorhynchus carnicus F. Solari, 1947
- Otiorhynchus chalceus Stierlin, 1861
- Otiorhynchus chrysonus Boheman, 1842
- Otiorhynchus densatus Boheman, 1842
- Otiorhynchus ormayi Stierlin, 1888
- Otiorhynchus relictus Apfelbeck, 1908
- Otiorhynchus remotegranulatus Stierlin, 1891
- Otiorhynchus roubali Penecke, 1931 - Hungary, Romania, and Slovakia
- Otiorhynchus splendidus Reitter, 1913
- Otiorhynchus vestitus Gyllenhal, 1834

== Subgenus Elendegus ==
- Otiorhynchus micros Hustache, 1932

== Subgenus Elvandrinus ==
- Otiorhynchus abnormicollis Reitter, 1912
- Otiorhynchus armeniacus Hochhuth, 1847
- Otiorhynchus latithorax Smreczyński, 1970

== Subgenus Eprahenus ==
- Otiorhynchus aksudshabaglinus Bajtenov, 1974
- Otiorhynchus albohirtus Faust, 1887
- Otiorhynchus alibekus Yunakov & Arzanov, 2002
- Otiorhynchus arctos Reitter, 1914
- Otiorhynchus argonauta Davidian & Savitsky, 2006 - Georgia (Abkhazia, Svaneti)
- Otiorhynchus beckeri Stierlin, 1875 - Russia (Dagestan)
- ‘’Otiorhynchus bidentatus’’ Stierlin, 1879 - Georgia
- Otiorhynchus carcelliformis Stierlin, 1896 - Georgia (Abkhazia, Mingrelia)
- Otiorhynchus conradti Faust, 1887
- Otiorhynchus cooteri Magnano & Colonnelli, 2014
- Otiorhynchus dittae Davidian & Savitsky, 2016
- Otiorhynchus elongatus Hochhuth, 1847
- Otiorhynchus gilgitensis Braun, 1988
- Otiorhynchus gumistiensis Davidian & Arzanov, 2002
- Otiorhynchus haplolophus Reitter, 1914
- Otiorhynchus hebes Reitter, 1890 - Georgia (Abkhazia)
- Otiorhynchus incivilis Gyllenhal, 1839
- Otiorhynchus juldusanus Reitter, 1914
- Otiorhynchus ketmenicus Bajtenov, 1974
- Otiorhynchus khipstensis Savitsky, 2022
- Otiorhynchus laticnemis Smreczyński, 1970
- Otiorhynchus marshalli F. Solari, 1937
- Otiorhynchus mikhaili (Davidian & Savitsky, 2002)
- Otiorhynchus mlokosevitshi Korotyaev, 2002
- Otiorhynchus moestificus Schoenherr, 1832 - Russia (Karachay-Cherkesia)
- Otiorhynchus olgae Davidian & Savitsky, 2006 - Georgia (Abkhazia)
- Otiorhynchus pertinax Faust, 1887
- Otiorhynchus planulus Braun, 1998
- Otiorhynchus pseudobeckeri Davidian & Savitsky, 2006 - Russia (Caucasus)
- Otiorhynchus schmidtianus Behne, 2003
- Otiorhynchus schneideri Stierlin, 1876
- Otiorhynchus segnis Gyllenhal, 1834
- Otiorhynchus subsquamulatus Stierlin, 1884 - Russia (Karachay-Cherkesia), Georgia (Abkhazia)
- Otiorhynchus swaneticus Reitter, 1883
- Otiorhynchus zariedoides Reitter, 1914

== Subgenus Ergiferanus ==
- Otiorhynchus coptocnemis Apfelbeck, 1919
- Otiorhynchus kopaonicensis Apfelbeck, 1912
- Otiorhynchus latitarsis Apfelbeck, 1919
- Otiorhynchus liburnicus Reitter, 1914
- Otiorhynchus marmota Stierlin, 1861
- Otiorhynchus monedula Stierlin, 1861
- Otiorhynchus mus Stierlin, 1862
- Otiorhynchus nubilus Boheman, 1842
- Otiorhynchus pedinorrhynchus Petri, 1928
- Otiorhynchus picitarsis Rosenhauer, 1856
- Otiorhynchus pierinus Reitter, 1914
- Otiorhynchus seriatosetulosus Hänel, 1934
- Otiorhynchus subnivalis Mesaros, 1990
- Otiorhynchus tanycerus Apfelbeck, 1922
- Otiorhynchus tener Stierlin, 1861
- Otiorhynchus valvasori Penecke, 1923
- Otiorhynchus velebiticus Stierlin, 1893
- Otiorhynchus vermionensis Lona, 1943
- Otiorhynchus zierisi Davidian & Savitsky, 2016

== Subgenus Eunihoides ==
- Otiorhynchus agilis Białooki, 2017 - Turkey (Isparta, Muğla)
- Otiorhynchus echinopterus Białooki, 2017 - Turkey (Muğla)
- Otiorhynchus pisidicus (Magnano, 2003)
- Otiorhynchus rhizophilus Białooki, 2017 - Turkey (Tekirdağ)

== Subgenus Eunihus ==
- Otiorhynchus abruzzensis Stierlin, 1893
- Otiorhynchus boroveci Magnano, 2002
- Otiorhynchus carpathicus K. Daniel & J. Daniel, 1898
- Otiorhynchus globulus Gredler, 1866
- Otiorhynchus grischunensis Germann, 2010
- Otiorhynchus hypsibatus Ganglbauer, 1896
- Otiorhynchus khatiparicus Davidian & Arzanov, 2006
- Otiorhynchus leonhardi Reitter, 1903
- Otiorhynchus levasseuri Roudier, 1961
- Otiorhynchus meoticus Davidian & Arzanov, 2006
- Otiorhynchus noskiewiczi Smreczynski, 1959
- Otiorhynchus poianae Penecke, 1927
- Otiorhynchus praetutiorum Di Marco & Osella, 1998
- Otiorhynchus proximus Stierlin, 1861
- Otiorhynchus rhilensis Stierlin, 1888
- Otiorhynchus salassorum Magnano, 1979
- Otiorhynchus uludagicus Magnano, 2002
- Otiorhynchus winkelmanni Magnano, 2004

== Subgenus Fondajenus ==
- Otiorhynchus amplicornis Białooki, 2017 - Turkey (Muğla)
- Otiorhynchus avgonicus Białooki, 2023
- Otiorhynchus crocotillus Białooki, 2017 - Greece (Central Greece)
- Otiorhynchus forficulatus Białooki, 2017 - Turkey (Muğla)
- Otiorhynchus forticornis Stierlin, 1896
- Otiorhynchus frenifer Białooki, 2023
- Otiorhynchus laticornis Białooki, 2023
- Otiorhynchus neroponticus Białooki, 2023
- Otiorhynchus peristericus Apfelbeck, 1902
- Otiorhynchus stierlini Gemminger, 1871

== Subgenus Geneledus ==
- Otiorhynchus pici A. Solari & F. Solari, 1905

== Subgenus Hanibotus ==
- Otiorhynchus angustifrons Stierlin, 1883 - Armenia, Azerbaijan (Lankaran-Astara), eastern Turkey, northern Iran
- Otiorhynchus longipilis Smreczyński, 1970 - northeastern and central Turkey
- Otiorhynchus nabozhenkorum Davidian & Savitsky, 2015
- Otiorhynchus subopacus Petri, 1915
- Otiorhynchus sulcibasis Reitter, 1895
- Otiorhynchus zajcevi Arnoldi, 1964 - Armenia

== Subgenus Holomrasus ==
- Otiorhynchus ongon Alonso-Zarazaga, 2013
- Otiorhynchus subocularis Arnoldi, 1975
- Otiorhynchus sushkini Arnoldi, 1975

== Subgenus Hygrorhynchus ==
- Otiorhynchus armicrus Fairmaire, 1866
- Otiorhynchus curvidens Voss, 1964
- Otiorhynchus emirensis Białooki, 2007

== Subgenus Italorrhynchus ==
- Otiorhynchus andreinii F. Solari, 1932 - Italy (Marche)
- Otiorhynchus angelinii (G. Osella, 1986) - Italy (Abruzzi)
- Otiorhynchus aquilanus (G. Osella, 1977) - Italy (Abruzzi)
- Otiorhynchus avoni Magrini, Bastianini & Abbazzi, 2008 - Italy (Lazio)
- Otiorhynchus bartolozzii Magrini, Meoli, Cirocchi & Abbazzi, 2004 - Italy (Tuscany)
- Otiorhynchus bastianinii Magrini, Meoli & Abbazzi, 2005 - Italy (Lazio)
- Otiorhynchus benellii Magrini, 2015
- Otiorhynchus camaldulensis (Rottenberg, 1870) - Italy (Campania)
- Otiorhynchus cirocchii (G. Osella & Abbazzi, 1985) - Italy (Umbria)
- Otiorhynchus consortii Magrini, Abbazzi & Cirocchi, 2002 - Italy (Sardinia)
- Otiorhynchus dauniae Magrini & Abbazzi, 2011 - Italy (Apulia)
- Otiorhynchus emanuelae Magrini, Meoli & Abbazzi, 2005 - Italy (Campania)
- Otiorhynchus fioronii Magrini, Meoli, Cirocchi & Abbazzi, 2004 - Italy (Umbria)
- Otiorhynchus giaquintoi F. Solari, 1932 - Italy
- Otiorhynchus gigantium Magrini, Fancello & Petrioli, 2015
- Otiorhynchus giuliabenellii Magrini & Benelli, 2021
- Otiorhynchus giustii (G. Osella, 1981) - Italy (Elba Island)
- Otiorhynchus hummleri Flach, 1899 - Italy (Marche)
- Otiorhynchus latellai G. Osella, Marotta & Silvani, 2006 - Italy (Lazio)
- Otiorhynchus latirostris (Bargagli, 1871) - Italy (Tuscany)
- Otiorhynchus laurae A. Solari & F. Solari, 1907 - Italy (Giglio Island)
- Otiorhynchus leonii A. Solari & F. Solari, 1909 - Italy (Abruzzo)
- Otiorhynchus magrinii (G. Osella, 1979) - Italy (Umbria)
- Otiorhynchus majusculus F. Solari, 1932 - Italy (Campagna di Roma)
- Otiorhynchus martinii (Fairmaire, 1862) - France (Aveyron)
- Otiorhynchus mayetii (Fairmaire, 1878) - France
- Otiorhynchus melonii Magrini, Abbazzi, Leo & Fancello, 2003 - Italy (Sardinia)
- Otiorhynchus microphthalmus A. Solari & F. Solari, 1909 - Italy (Abruzzo)
- Otiorhynchus milazzoi Magrini, Petrioli & Daino, 2011 - Italy (Sicily)
- Otiorhynchus monteleonii (Abbazzi & Osella, 1975) - Italy
- Otiorhynchus pacei (G. Osella, 1977) - Italy (Lazio)
- Otiorhynchus paulae Magrini, Bastianini & Abbazzi, 2008 - Italy (Lazio)
- Otiorhynchus pennisii (G. Osella & Abbazzi, 1985) - Italy (Lazio)
- Otiorhynchus petriolii Magrini & Degiovanni, 2016 - Italy (Lazio)
- Otiorhynchus sabinus Magrini, Meoli & Abbazzi, 2005 - Italy (Lazio)
- Otiorhynchus samniticus (G. Osella, 1977) - Italy (Molise)
- Otiorhynchus sardous F. Solari, 1932 - Italy (Sardinia)
- Otiorhynchus sbordonianus G. Osella, 2008 - Italy (Lazio)
- Otiorhynchus stolzi (Holdhaus, 1908) - Italy (Tuscany)
- Otiorhynchus taitii (Abbazzi, Bartolozzi & G. Osella, 1992) - Italy (Tuscany)
- Otiorhynchus terricola (Linder, 1863) - France and Spain
- Otiorhynchus vignolii Magrini & Petrioli, 2020
- Otiorhynchus virginiae Magrini, Abbazzi & Cirocchi, 2002 - Italy (Umbria)

== Subgenus Jelenantus ==
- Otiorhynchus affaber Boheman, 1842
- Otiorhynchus avariae (Español, 1979) - Spain (Valencia)
- Otiorhynchus beauprei A. Solari & F. Solari, 1905
- Otiorhynchus hecarti A. Hoffmann, 1954
- Otiorhynchus henonii Fairmaire, 1867
- Otiorhynchus intermedius (Hustache, 1923) - Morocco
- Otiorhynchus mairei (Peyerimhoff, 1913) - Algeria
- Otiorhynchus muricatipennis (Desbrochers des Loges, 1896)
- Otiorhynchus pardoi A. Hoffmann, 1954
- Otiorhynchus planophthalmus Heyden, 1870
- Otiorhynchus pseudaffaber Reitter, 1913
- Otiorhynchus tiaretanus Reitter, 1913

== Subgenus Kreinidinus ==
- Otiorhynchus planiceps K. Daniel & J. Daniel, 1898

== Subgenus Lixorrhynchus ==
- Otiorhynchus gracilis Gyllenhal, 1834 - France and Italy
- Otiorhynchus gridellii (Español, 1949) - Spain (Catalonia)
- Otiorhynchus hystricis Casalini & Colonnelli, 2014
- Otiorhynchus irenae (Hoffmann, 1956) - Spain (Estremadura)
- Otiorhynchus montigena Marseul, 1873
- Otiorhynchus setiger (Waltl, 1835)
- Otiorhynchus sulcicollis (Hoffmann, 1956)
- Otiorhynchus torressalai (Español, 1945) - Spain (Valencia)
- Otiorhynchus zariquieyi (Clermont, 1949) - Spain (Girona)

== Subgenus Lolatismus ==
- Otiorhynchus antennatus Stierlin, 1861
- Otiorhynchus aratus K. Daniel & J. Daniel, 1898
- Otiorhynchus bohemani Stierlin, 1877
- Otiorhynchus cosmopterus K. Daniel & J. Daniel, 1898
- Otiorhynchus dacicus K. Daniel & J. Daniel, 1898
- Otiorhynchus lasius (Germar, 1817)
- Otiorhynchus manellii Osella & Zuppa, 1994
- Otiorhynchus negoiensis Lona, 1923
- Otiorhynchus pirinicus Lona, 1939
- Otiorhynchus porcatus (Herbst, 1795)
- Otiorhynchus secretus Reitter, 1913
- Otiorhynchus skiperiae Csiki, 1943
- Otiorhynchus troyeri Stierlin, 1883

== Subgenus Magnanotius ==
- Otiorhynchus amplus Petri, 1902
- Otiorhynchus auromaculatus Formánek, 1927
- Otiorhynchus brandisi Apfelbeck, 1896
- Otiorhynchus buchtarmensis Bajtenov, 1977
- Otiorhynchus deubeli Ganglbauer, 1896
- Otiorhynchus equestris (Richter, 1820)
- Otiorhynchus kollari Gyllenhal, 1834
- Otiorhynchus kuenburgi Stierlin, 1866
- Otiorhynchus mehelii Stierlin, 1895
- Otiorhynchus norici Alonso-Zarazaga, 2013
- Otiorhynchus obtusus Boheman, 1842
- Otiorhynchus peneckianus Smreczyński, 1963
- Otiorhynchus primigenius Apfelbeck, 1928
- Otiorhynchus reichei Stierlin, 1861
- Otiorhynchus rhododendroni Bajtenov, 1977
- Otiorhynchus rufomarginatus Stierlin, 1883
- Otiorhynchus schaumii Stierlin, 1861
- Otiorhynchus verrucipes Apfelbeck, 1899

== Subgenus Majetnecus ==
- Otiorhynchus lepidopterus (Fabricius, 1794)
- Otiorhynchus squamulatus Stierlin, 1861

== Subgenus Melasemnus ==
- Otiorhynchus aloysii Alonso-Zarazaga, 2013
- Otiorhynchus apschuanus Reitter, 1914
- Otiorhynchus attenuatus Stierlin, 1879
- Otiorhynchus bisphaericus Reiche & Saulcy, 1858
- Otiorhynchus brevipennis Stierlin, 1892
- Otiorhynchus ceviki Keskin, 2007 - Turkey (İzmir, Manisa)
- Otiorhynchus cruralis Stierlin, 1894
- Otiorhynchus cukalensis Apfelbeck, 1919
- Otiorhynchus euxinus Apfelbeck, 1899
- Otiorhynchus globipes Apfelbeck, 1919
- Otiorhynchus hindukuschensis Voss, 1959
- Otiorhynchus jugigradens Hänel, 1934
- Otiorhynchus kulzeri Zumpt, 1933
- Otiorhynchus laevipennis Stierlin, 1888
- Otiorhynchus lagenaria Marseul, 1878
- Otiorhynchus mersanicus (Hustache, 1934)
- Otiorhynchus nitidus Reiche, 1857
- Otiorhynchus ovalipennis Boheman, 1842
- Otiorhynchus rufitarsis Stierlin, 1901
- Otiorhynchus spinifer K. Daniel & J. Daniel, 1902 - Turkey (Anatolia)
- Otiorhynchus steindachneri Apfelbeck, 1907
- Otiorhynchus tetrarchus Reitter, 1914
- Otiorhynchus thaliarchus Reitter, 1914
- Otiorhynchus transsylvanicus Stierlin, 1861
- Otiorhynchus ukrainicus Korotyaev, 1984

== Subgenus Meriplodus ==
- Otiorhynchus alatavicus Bajtenov, 1974
- Otiorhynchus davidiani Magnano, 2006 - western Kyrgyzstan
- Otiorhynchus dshungaricus Bajtenov, 1974 - southern Kazakhstan
- Otiorhynchus duplopilosus Reitter, 1912 - southern Kazakhstan
- Otiorhynchus luigii Alonso-Zarazaga, 2013
- Otiorhynchus manderstjernae Ballion, 1878
- Otiorhynchus marquardtianus Reitter, 1900 - Kyrgyzstan, southern Kazakhstan
- Otiorhynchus mutilatus Magnano, 2006 - Kazakhstan
- Otiorhynchus oldrici Magnano, 2006 - Kyrgyzstan
- Otiorhynchus schawalleri Magnano, 2006 - Kyrgyzstan
- Otiorhynchus supremus Reitter, 1912 - Russia (Altai)
- Otiorhynchus tadzikstanicus Magnano, 2006 - Tajikistan
- Otiorhynchus ugamicus Bajtenov, 1974 - southern Kazakhstan
- Otiorhynchus yarodaricus Magnano, 2006 - Kyrgyzstan

== Subgenus Mesaniomus ==
- Otiorhynchus albanicus Apfelbeck, 1907
- Otiorhynchus alphonsi Lona, 1939
- Otiorhynchus cirrhocnemis Apfelbeck, 1908
- Otiorhynchus georgii Lona, 1922
- Otiorhynchus longipennis Stierlin, 1861
- Otiorhynchus microsquamosus Białooki, 2023
- Otiorhynchus planiventris Białooki, 2023
- Otiorhynchus polycoccus Gyllenhal, 1842
- Otiorhynchus prisrensis Apfelbeck, 1922
- Otiorhynchus rolandi Białooki, 2023
- Otiorhynchus skoelsen Csiki, 1940
- Otiorhynchus squamiventris Białooki, 2023

== Subgenus Metopiorrhynchus ==
- Otiorhynchus axatensis A. Hoffmann, 1930
- Otiorhynchus breviclavatus Stierlin, 1883
- Otiorhynchus camunus Magnano, 1973
- Otiorhynchus cancellatus Boheman, 1842
- Otiorhynchus carmagnolae (A. Villa & G. B. Villa, 1835)
- Otiorhynchus cesaraccioi G. Osella, Mammoli & Zuppa, 1991
- Otiorhynchus claudiae Perez, Cantot, Rouault & Komeza, 2020
- Otiorhynchus cornirostris Reitter, 1914
- Otiorhynchus cyclophthalmus F. Solari, 1946
- Otiorhynchus cyclopterus F. Solari, 1946
- Otiorhynchus delicatulus Marseul, 1873
- Otiorhynchus diecki Stierlin, 1872
- Otiorhynchus difficilis Stierlin, 1858
- Otiorhynchus diversicollis Lona, 1939
- Otiorhynchus dolichopterus Magnano, 1967
- Otiorhynchus franciscoloi F. Solari, 1947
- Otiorhynchus frigidus Mulsant & Rey, 1859
- Otiorhynchus ianuargenti G. Osella, Mammoli & Zuppa, 1991
- Otiorhynchus impressiventris Fairmaire, 1859
- Otiorhynchus insolitus Magnano, 1967
- Otiorhynchus intrusus Reiche, 1862
- Otiorhynchus labilis Stierlin, 1883
- Otiorhynchus litigiosus Magnano, 1967
- Otiorhynchus lostiai G. Osella, Mammoli & Zuppa, 1991
- Otiorhynchus nigrinus F. Solari, 1946
- Otiorhynchus pasubianus F. Solari, 1946
- Otiorhynchus pignoris Reitter, 1914
- Otiorhynchus procerus Stierlin, 1875
- Otiorhynchus pupillatus Gyllenhal, 1834
- Otiorhynchus pusillus Stierlin, 1861
- Otiorhynchus respersus Stierlin, 1861
- Otiorhynchus rhododendri Stierlin, 1861
- Otiorhynchus rosaemariae Magnano, 1973
- Otiorhynchus singularis (Linnaeus, 1767)
- Otiorhynchus teretirostris Stierlin, 1866
- Otiorhynchus tirolensis Stierlin, 1894
- Otiorhynchus varius Boheman, 1842
- Otiorhynchus vernalis Stierlin, 1861
- Otiorhynchus veterator Uyttenboogaart, 1932

== Subgenus Microhanibotus ==
- Otiorhynchus ghilarovi Davidian & Savitsky, 2015

== Subgenus Mierginus ==
- Otiorhynchus auricapillus Germar, 1823
- Otiorhynchus clathratus (Germar, 1817)
- Otiorhynchus montivagus Boheman, 1842

== Subgenus Misenatus ==
- Otiorhynchus biroi Csiki, 1943
- Otiorhynchus johannae Colonnelli, 2018 - Greece (Crete)
- Otiorhynchus lugens (Germar, 1817)
- Otiorhynchus spartanus Kirsch, 1880 - Greece (Peloponnese)
- Otiorhynchus trojanus Stierlin, 1861

== Subgenus Mitadileus ==
- Otiorhynchus euboicus Apfelbeck, 1922 - Greece (Central Greece)
- Otiorhynchus kiesenwetteri Stierlin, 1861
- Otiorhynchus olympicola Penecke, 1928 - Greece (Central Macedonia, Peloponnese, Thessaly)
- Otiorhynchus pachycerus Csiki, 1943

== Subgenus Mitomiris ==
- Otiorhynchus akinini Stierlin, 1883
- Otiorhynchus astutus (Faust, 1887)
- Otiorhynchus esau Stierlin, 1883
- Otiorhynchus furiosus Reitter, 1916
- Otiorhynchus hellerianus Reitter, 1912
- Otiorhynchus inhabilis Reitter, 1912
- Otiorhynchus laniger Faust, 1887
- Otiorhynchus lumenifer Reitter, 1895
- Otiorhynchus maidantalensis Bajtenov, 1974
- Otiorhynchus perlucens Reitter, 1912
- Otiorhynchus psalidiformis Reitter, 1895
- Otiorhynchus refrigeratus Stierlin, 1883
- Otiorhynchus sairamensis Bajtenov, 1974
- Otiorhynchus subsedulus Bajtenov, 1974
- Otiorhynchus tardipes Reitter, 1912
- Otiorhynchus tianschanicus Bajtenov, 1974
- Otiorhynchus zumpti Lona, 1933

== Subgenus Mongolorrhynchus ==
- Otiorhynchus altaipilosus Legalov, 2021
- Otiorhynchus ivanovi Legalov, 2021
- Otiorhynchus mordkovitshi Arnoldi, 1975
- Otiorhynchus populiger Arnoldi, 1975
- Otiorhynchus pupilliger Arnoldi, 1975
- Otiorhynchus rectipilosus Arnoldi, 1975
- Otiorhynchus tuvensis Korotyaev, 1995

== Subgenus Motilacanus ==
- Otiorhynchus conspiciabilis Gyllenhal, 1839
- Otiorhynchus madari Formánek, 1926
- Otiorhynchus titarenkoi Davidian & Savitsky, 2016
- Otiorhynchus validicornis Gyllenhal, 1839

== Subgenus Namertanus ==
- Otiorhynchus argus (Reitter, 1896) - Russia (Caucasus), Georgia (Abkhazia) and Turkey (Artvin)
- Otiorhynchus glebi Davidian & Savitsky, 2006 - Russia (Krasnodar Krai)
- Otiorhynchus juno Davidian & Savitsky, 2006
- Otiorhynchus kurbatovi Davidian & Savitsky, 2006 - Georgia (Abkhazia)
- Otiorhynchus laminatus Davidian & Savitsky, 2006
- Otiorhynchus nairicus Iablokoff-Khnzorian, 1957 - Armenia and Azerbaijan
- Otiorhynchus nasutus Stierlin, 1876
- Otiorhynchus pseudomeiranella Davidian & Savitsky, 2006
- Otiorhynchus pseudomias Hochhuth, 1847
- Otiorhynchus vargovitchi Davidian, 2007 - Russia (Krasnodar Krai)

== Subgenus Necotaleus ==
- Otiorhynchus contarinii G. Osella & Zuppa, 1994 - Italy (Marche, Abruzzo, Lazio)
- Otiorhynchus croaticus Stierlin, 1861
- Otiorhynchus hawelkae Apfelbeck, 1929
- Otiorhynchus sirentensis D'Amore-Fracassi, 1906 - Italy (Abruzzo, Lazio, Campania, Molise)
- Otiorhynchus vestinus Magnano, 1977 - Italy (Abruzzo, Lazio, Marche)

== Subgenus Nehrodistus ==
- Otiorhynchus adspersus Boheman, 1842
- Otiorhynchus armatus Boheman, 1842
- Otiorhynchus bruckensis Marseul, 1873
- Otiorhynchus caviventris Angelov, 1973
- Otiorhynchus corruptor (Host, 1790)
- Otiorhynchus gallopavo Pesarini, 1971
- Otiorhynchus goebli Reitter, 1914
- Otiorhynchus graecus Stierlin, 1861
- Otiorhynchus innominatus F. Solari, 1940
- Otiorhynchus leorum Yunakov, 2001
- Otiorhynchus obesus Stierlin, 1861
- Otiorhynchus pesarinii Diotti, 2008
- Otiorhynchus populeti Boheman, 1842
- Otiorhynchus rhamni Apfelbeck, 1896
- Otiorhynchus rhinoceros F. Solari, 1940
- Otiorhynchus scitoides Pesarini, 1975
- Otiorhynchus scitus Gyllenhal, 1842
- Otiorhynchus sorbivorus Reitter, 1914
- Otiorhynchus tiflensis Reitter, 1915
- Otiorhynchus turca Boheman, 1842

== Subgenus Neobudemoides ==
- Otiorhynchus bosdaghensis Lona, 1937 - Greece (Eastern Macedonia and Thrace)
- Otiorhynchus carcelloides Stierlin, 1888
- Otiorhynchus cornacchiai Magnano, 1996

== Subgenus Nihus ==
- Otiorhynchus axatensis Hoffmann, 1930
- Otiorhynchus azaleae Penecke, 1894
- Otiorhynchus breviclavatus Stierlin, 1883
- Otiorhynchus camunus Magnano, 1973
- Otiorhynchus cancellatus Boheman, 1842
- Otiorhynchus carinatopunctatus (Retzius, 1783)
- Otiorhynchus carmagnolae (Villa & Villa, 1835)
- Otiorhynchus cesaraccioi Osella, Mamoli & Zuppa, 1991
- Otiorhynchus claudiae Perez, Cantot, Rouault & Komeza, 2020
- Otiorhynchus cornirostris Reitter, 1914
- Otiorhynchus cyclophthalmus Solari, 1946
- Otiorhynchus cyclopterus Solari, 1946
- Otiorhynchus delicatulus Stierlin, 1872
- Otiorhynchus diecki Stierlin, 1872
- Otiorhynchus difficilis Stierlin, 1858
- Otiorhynchus diversicollis Lona, 1939
- Otiorhynchus dolichopterus Magnano, 1967
- Otiorhynchus franciscoloi Solari, 1947
- Otiorhynchus frigidus Mulsant & Rey, 1859
- Otiorhynchus gredleri J. Daniel & K. Daniel, 1898
- Otiorhynchus hypocrita Rosenhauer, 1847
- Otiorhynchus ianuargenti Osella, Mammoli & Zuppa, 1991
- Otiorhynchus impressiventris Fairmaire, 1859
- Otiorhynchus insolitus Magnano, 1967
- Otiorhynchus intrusus Reiche, 1862
- Otiorhynchus labilis Stierlin, 1883
- Otiorhynchus litigiosus Magnano, 1967
- Otiorhynchus lostiai Osella, Mammoli & Zuppa, 1991
- Otiorhynchus muffi Germann, 2014
- Otiorhynchus nigrinus Solari, 1946
- Otiorhynchus pignoris Reitter, 1914
- Otiorhynchus procerus Stierlin, 1875
- Otiorhynchus pupillatus Gyllenhal, 1834
- Otiorhynchus pusillus Stierlin, 1861
- Otiorhynchus respersus Stierlin, 1861
- Otiorhynchus rhododendri Stierlin, 1861
- Otiorhynchus rosaemariae Magnano, 1973
- Otiorhynchus singularis (Linnaeus, 1767)
- Otiorhynchus spaethi Reitter, 1913
- Otiorhynchus subcostatus Stierlin, 1866
- Otiorhynchus subdentatus Bach, 1854
- Otiorhynchus teretirostris Stierlin, 1866
- Otiorhynchus tirolensis Stierlin, 1894
- Otiorhynchus uncinatus Germar, 1823
- Otiorhynchus varius Boheman, 1842
- Otiorhynchus venustus Stierlin, 1880
- Otiorhynchus vernalis Stierlin, 1861
- Otiorhynchus veterator Uyttenboogaart, 1932 - northeastern Spain, France, Belgium, The Netherlands, Luxembourg, Germany, Switzerland, southern United Kingdom

== Subgenus Nilepolemis ==
- Otiorhynchus alpestris (Comolli, 1837)
- Otiorhynchus articulatus K. Daniel & J. Daniel, 1898
- Otiorhynchus breiti Franz, 1938
- Otiorhynchus cadoricus K. Daniel & J. Daniel, 1891
- Otiorhynchus coniceps K. Daniel & J. Daniel, 1898
- Otiorhynchus decipiens Franz, 1938
- Otiorhynchus dieneri Csiki, 1943
- Otiorhynchus distincticornis Rosenhauer, 1847
- Otiorhynchus hadrocerus K. Daniel & J. Daniel, 1898
- Otiorhynchus kuennemanni Reitter, 1917
- Otiorhynchus lessinicus Franz, 1938
- Otiorhynchus lombardus Stierlin, 1866
- Otiorhynchus nocturnus Reitter, 1913
- Otiorhynchus pigrans Stierlin, 1861
- Otiorhynchus schaubergeri Lona, 1923
- Otiorhynchus sulcatellus K. Daniel & J. Daniel, 1898
- Otiorhynchus tagenioides Stierlin, 1861

== Subgenus Nubidanops ==
- Otiorhynchus torosicus Davidian & L. Gültekin, 2016
- Otiorhynchus tumidicollis Stierlin, 1861

== Subgenus Nubidanus ==
- Otiorhynchus atricolor Reitter, 1912
- Otiorhynchus coyei Marseul, 1868
- Otiorhynchus crassiceps Reitter, 1912
- Otiorhynchus densicollis Reitter, 1912
- Otiorhynchus hajastani Arnoldi, 1967
- Otiorhynchus hebraeus Stierlin, 1861
- Otiorhynchus heinzorum Braun, 2002
- Otiorhynchus impexus Schoenherr, 1832
- Otiorhynchus jarpachlinus Reitter, 1912
- Otiorhynchus juvenilis Schoenherr, 1832
- Otiorhynchus marseuli Stierlin, 1872
- Otiorhynchus messenicus Stierlin, 1872
- Otiorhynchus minutus Stierlin, 1875
- Otiorhynchus poricollis Schoenherr, 1832
- Otiorhynchus punctirostris Stierlin, 1883
- Otiorhynchus semigranulatus Stierlin, 1861
- Otiorhynchus semituberculatus Stierlin, 1872
- Otiorhynchus transparens (Fischer von Waldheim, 1821)

== Subgenus Obvoderus ==
- Otiorhynchus abchasicus Rost, 1892
- Otiorhynchus aurosquamulatus Retowski, 1887
- Otiorhynchus romantsovi Davidian & Savitsky, 2002 - Georgia (Abkhazia)
- Otiorhynchus solodovnikovi Davidian & Savitsky, 2002

== Subgenus Odelengus ==
- Otiorhynchus aberrans Stierlin, 1876
- Otiorhynchus agmentosus Białooki, 2017 - Turkey (Niğde)
- Otiorhynchus angustirostris Smreczyński, 1977
- Otiorhynchus armentalis Białooki, 2017 - Turkey (Aksaray, Niğde)
- Otiorhynchus cappadocicus Białooki, 2017 - Turkey (Niğde, Konya, Aksaray)
- Otiorhynchus crepuscularis Białooki, 2017 - Turkey (Şanlıurfa, Diyarbakır)
- Otiorhynchus dudkoi Davidian & L. Gültekin, 2016
- Otiorhynchus fracticornis Białooki, 2017 - Turkey (Konya, Antalya)
- Otiorhynchus hebetes Białooki, 2017 - Turkey (Adana)
- Otiorhynchus heinzi Smreczyński, 1970
- Otiorhynchus judaicus Stierlin, 1875
- Otiorhynchus malinkai Białooki, 2017 - Turkey (Niğde)
- Otiorhynchus maximi Davidian & L. Gültekin, 2016
- Otiorhynchus phrygius Reitter, 1912
- Otiorhynchus pipitzi Stierlin, 1884
- Otiorhynchus porculus Białooki, 2017 - Turkey (Aksaray)
- Otiorhynchus vavrai Białooki, 2017 - Turkey (Niğde)
- Otiorhynchus wanati Białooki, 2017 - Turkey (Karaman, Konya)

== Subgenus Osmobodes ==
- Otiorhynchus angelovi Bajtenov, 1977
- Otiorhynchus beatus Faust, 1890
- Otiorhynchus brevilatus Arnoldi, 1975
- Otiorhynchus confluens Reitter, 1912
- Otiorhynchus cribrosicollis Boheman, 1842
- Otiorhynchus curvimanus Reitter, 1912
- Otiorhynchus emeljanovi Arnoldi, 1975
- Otiorhynchus havtagi Arnoldi, 1975
- Otiorhynchus innocuus Boheman, 1842
- Otiorhynchus kerzhneri Korotyaev, 1995
- Otiorhynchus khentejensis Arnoldi, 1975
- Otiorhynchus kozlovi Arnoldi, 1975
- Otiorhynchus medvedevi Korotyaev, 1995
- Otiorhynchus mongolicus Reitter, 1912
- Otiorhynchus strebloffi Stierlin, 1880
- Otiorhynchus tenuimanus Faust, 1890
- Otiorhynchus venalis Faust, 1888

== Subgenus Otiolehus ==
- Otiorhynchus anthracinus (Scopoli, 1763)
- Otiorhynchus bonomii Lona, 1943
- Otiorhynchus brasavolae Lona, 1943
- Otiorhynchus etropolensis Apfelbeck, 1899
- Otiorhynchus inunctus Stierlin, 1861
- Otiorhynchus oligolepis Apfelbeck, 1919
- Otiorhynchus plagiator Apfelbeck, 1919
- Otiorhynchus rambouseki Apfelbeck, 1919
- Otiorhynchus rugosogranulatus Stierlin, 1888
- Otiorhynchus schatzmayri Lona, 1922
- Otiorhynchus sculptirostris Hochhuth, 1847
- Otiorhynchus spinidens Apfelbeck, 1919
- Otiorhynchus tristis (Scopoli, 1763)
- Otiorhynchus veluchiensis Hoffmann, 1957
- Otiorhynchus wernerianus Reitter, 1914

== Subgenus Otiomimus ==
- Otiorhynchus alemdaghensis Reitter, 1913
- Otiorhynchus carcelii Gyllenhal, 1842
- Otiorhynchus cepelarus Angelov, 1974
- Otiorhynchus desbrochersi Stierlin, 1883
- Otiorhynchus graniger Reiche & Saulcy, 1858
- Otiorhynchus setosellus Zumpt, 1936
- Otiorhynchus subspinosus Stierlin, 1861

== Subgenus Otiorhynchus ==
- Otiorhynchus aequus Casalini & Magnano, 2005
- Otiorhynchus amplipennis Fairmaire, 1860
- Otiorhynchus amputatus Chevrolat, 1872
- Otiorhynchus angelae Magrini, Abbazzi, Magnano & Baviera, 2007
- Otiorhynchus armadillo (Rossi, 1792) - Europe, Turkey (Anatolia), Lebanon
- Otiorhynchus aurifer Boheman, 1842 - Europe, Turkey
- Otiorhynchus auropunctatus Gyllenhal, 1834 - British Isles, France, northeastern Spain
- Otiorhynchus auropupillatus Stierlin, 1861
- Otiorhynchus bertarini Stierlin, 1894
- Otiorhynchus binaghii Luigioni, 1931
- Otiorhynchus bisulcatus (Fabricius, 1781) - Central Europe, Balkans, northeastern Italy, eastern Ukraine
- Otiorhynchus brattiensis J. Müller, 1904
- Otiorhynchus brigantii Pesarini, 1980
- Otiorhynchus cancasanus Reitter, 1913
- Otiorhynchus cardiniger (Host, 1789) - northeastern Italy, Slovenia, Hungary, Croatia, Bosnia & Herzegovina, Montenegro, Albania
- Otiorhynchus carracinorum Colonnelli, 2022
- Otiorhynchus caudatus (Rossi, 1792) - Italy (mainland, Sicily), Slovenia, Croatia, Montenegro (?)
- Otiorhynchus civis Stierlin, 1861
- Otiorhynchus clavipes (Bonsdorff, 1785) - Europe
- Otiorhynchus coecus Germar, 1824
- Otiorhynchus coesipes Mulsant & Rey, 1859
- Otiorhynchus comatus Petri, 1912
- Otiorhynchus concinnus Gyllenhal, 1834
- Otiorhynchus corticalis Lucas, 1846
- Otiorhynchus curlettii Meregalli, 1991
- Otiorhynchus fagi Gyllenhal, 1834 - Europe and introduced to North America (?)
- Otiorhynchus fortis Rosenhauer, 1847
- Otiorhynchus friulicus (Herbst, 1797)
- Otiorhynchus ghilianii Fairmaire, 1857
- Otiorhynchus grouvellei Stierlin, 1883
- Otiorhynchus gylippus Reitter, 1898
- Otiorhynchus hungaricus Germar, 1823 - Europe
- Otiorhynchus insubricus (Comolli, 1837)
- Otiorhynchus issensis J. Müller, 1916
- Otiorhynchus jaenensis Stierlin, 1874
- Otiorhynchus lanuginosus Boheman, 1842 - The Alps
- Otiorhynchus latinus Casalini & Magnano, 2005
- Otiorhynchus lesinicus Reitter, 1913
- Otiorhynchus lirus Schönherr, 1834 - Europe
- Otiorhynchus lugdunensis Boheman, 1842 - Europe
- Otiorhynchus luigionii A. Solari & F. Solari, 1909
- Otiorhynchus margaritifer Reitter, 1913
- Otiorhynchus martinensis C. Müller, 1898
- Otiorhynchus meridionalis Gyllenhal, 1834
- Otiorhynchus mesnili Hoffmann, 1936 - Spain (Andalusia)
- Otiorhynchus metokianus Apfelbeck, 1896
- Otiorhynchus minutesquamosus A. Solari & F. Solari, 1909
- Otiorhynchus mirei A. Hoffmann, 1964
- Otiorhynchus multipunctatus (Fabricius, 1792) - Central Europe, Balkans, northeastern Italy, eastern Ukraine
- Otiorhynchus orientalis Gyllenhal, 1834
- Otiorhynchus osellai Magnano, 1969
- Otiorhynchus pajarensis Reitter, 1913
- Otiorhynchus paradisiacus Pesarini, 1968
- Otiorhynchus praenestinus Casalini & Magnano, 2005 - Italy (Lazio)
- Otiorhynchus pseudonothus Apfelbeck, 1897 - Europe
- Otiorhynchus pyrenaeus Gyllenhal, 1834
- Otiorhynchus repletus Boheman, 1842
- Otiorhynchus rhacusensis (Germar, 1822)
- Otiorhynchus roudieri González, 1963
- Otiorhynchus ruffoi Magnano, 1969
- Otiorhynchus salinellensis Casalini & Magnano, 2005
- Otiorhynchus scaberrimus Stierlin, 1861 - Italy (Lazio)
- Otiorhynchus sellae Stierlin, 1881
- Otiorhynchus shatorensis Apfelbeck, 1928
- Otiorhynchus sibillinicus Magnano, 1969
- Otiorhynchus spalatrensis Boheman, 1842
- Otiorhynchus stomachosus Gyllenhal, 1834
- Otiorhynchus stricticollis Fairmaire, 1859
- Otiorhynchus subauriculus Reitter, 1913
- Otiorhynchus sulcogemmatus Boheman, 1842
- Otiorhynchus sulphurifer (Fabricius, 1801)
- Otiorhynchus tenebricosus (Herbst, 1784)
- Otiorhynchus transadriaticus Reitter, 1913
- Otiorhynchus trichophorus Meregalli, 1991
- Otiorhynchus truncatellus Graells, 1858
- Otiorhynchus vehemens Boheman, 1842
- Otiorhynchus voriseki Meregalli, 1991
- Otiorhynchus wittmeri Legalov, 1999

== Subgenus Otismotilus ==
- Otiorhynchus abashae Davidian & Yunakov, 2002
- Otiorhynchus akibae Davidian & Yunakov, 2002
- Otiorhynchus auroguttatus Stierlin, 1879
- Otiorhynchus belousovi Davidian & Yunakov, 2002
- Otiorhynchus chaudoirii Hochhuth, 1851
- Otiorhynchus crassiphallicus Białooki, 2017 - Turkey (Ilgaz Mountains)
- Otiorhynchus depressus Stierlin, 1875
- Otiorhynchus digitalis Yunakov & Davidian, 2002
- Otiorhynchus dvaleticus Davidian & Yunakov, 2002
- Otiorhynchus granulatostriatus Stierlin, 1876
- Otiorhynchus kataevi Davidian & Yunakov, 2002
- Otiorhynchus madinae Davidian & Yunakov, 2002
- Otiorhynchus maganicus Davidian & Yunakov, 2002
- Otiorhynchus oezbeki Davidian & Yunakov, 2002
- Otiorhynchus paradigitalis Davidian, 2020
- Otiorhynchus quadratopunctatus Stierlin, 1884
- Otiorhynchus svetgaricus Davidian & Yunakov, 2002
- Otiorhynchus tatyanae Davidian & Yunakov, 2002
- Otiorhynchus titae Davidian & Yunakov, 2002
- Otiorhynchus tshistyakovae Davidian & Yunakov, 2002

== Subgenus Padilehus ==
- Otiorhynchus hickeri Penecke, 1931
- Otiorhynchus pinastri (Herbst, 1795)

== Subgenus Panorosemus ==
- Otiorhynchus gibbicollis Boheman, 1842
- Otiorhynchus liebmanni Lona, 1943
- Otiorhynchus ottomanus Stierlin, 1861 - Turkey (Bursa)
- Otiorhynchus porcellus K. Daniel & J. Daniel, 1898

== Subgenus Paracryphiphorus ==
- Otiorhynchus alutaceus (Germar, 1817) - Albania, Montenegro, Bosnia & Herzegovina, Croatia, Slovenia, Italy (Mainland, Sardinia)
- Otiorhynchus bicostatus Boheman, 1842
- Otiorhynchus carbo Pesarini, 1980
- Otiorhynchus catenulatus (Panzer, 1795)
- Otiorhynchus droveniki Braun, 1996
- Otiorhynchus edentatus Seidlitz, 1891
- Otiorhynchus emiliae Apfelbeck, 1894
- Otiorhynchus kyllinensis Apfelbeck, 1922
- Otiorhynchus liophloeoides Apfelbeck, 1894
- Otiorhynchus luteus Stierlin, 1862
- Otiorhynchus magnanoi Keskin, 2007
- Otiorhynchus modestus Stierlin, 1875
- Otiorhynchus montandoni A. Solari & F. Solari, 1904
- Otiorhynchus nuncius Faust, 1890
- Otiorhynchus petrensis Boheman, 1842
- Otiorhynchus picimanus Stierlin, 1861
- Otiorhynchus pindicola Braun, 1996
- Otiorhynchus strumosus Heller, 1884
- Otiorhynchus subnudus Stierlin, 1888
- Otiorhynchus wankae (Reitter, 1909)

== Subgenus Paradoxidis ==
- Otiorhynchus mongolicola Arnoldi, 1975

== Subgenus Parahanibotus ==
- Otiorhynchus brevinasus Reitter, 1910 - western Iran
- Otiorhynchus danilewskii Davidian & Savitsky, 2006 - southern Azerbaijan
- Otiorhynchus eques Reitter, 1895 - Azerbaijan (Nakhchivan)
- Otiorhynchus glazunovi Davidian & Savitsky, 2012 - northern Iran
- Otiorhynchus iranicus Arnoldi, 1964 - northern Iran
- Otiorhynchus mazdaranicus Magnano, 2006 - Iran (Mazdaran)
- Otiorhynchus pereques Davidian & Savitsky, 2012 - Armenia (?)
- Otiorhynchus rebmanni Zumpt, 1933
- Otiorhynchus subeques Reitter, 1912 - Armenia, southern Azerbaijan, northern Iran

== Subgenus Pavesiella ==
- Otiorhynchus aemulus Marseul, 1878
- Otiorhynchus caroli Stierlin, 1893
- Otiorhynchus cataphractus Mazur, 1983
- Otiorhynchus compressus Stierlin, 1861
- Otiorhynchus diotus Reitter, 1895
- Otiorhynchus erivanensis Reitter, 1894
- Otiorhynchus horasanicus Davidian & L. Gültekin, 2007
- Otiorhynchus karsavurani Davidian & L. Gültekin, 2006
- Otiorhynchus lederi Stierlin, 1876
- Otiorhynchus temeli Davidian & L. Gültekin, 2006
- Otiorhynchus xenophthalmus (Pesarini, 1996)

== Subgenus Pendragon ==
- Otiorhynchus clemens Gyllenhal, 1834
- Otiorhynchus desertus Rosenhauer, 1847
- Otiorhynchus flavopilosus Apfelbeck, 1922
- Otiorhynchus kuraicus Korotyaev, 1998
- Otiorhynchus kytherus Reitter, 1914
- Otiorhynchus merklii Stierlin, 1880
- Otiorhynchus ovatus (Linnaeus, 1758)
- Otiorhynchus punctipennis Smreczyński, 1977
- Otiorhynchus schusteri Stierlin, 1897
- Otiorhynchus serbicus Apfelbeck, 1922
- Otiorhynchus serdicanus Apfelbeck, 1922
- Otiorhynchus subellipticus Apfelbeck, 1922

== Subgenus Phalantorrhynchus ==
- Otiorhynchus allomorphus Meregalli, 1986
- Otiorhynchus alonsoi Meregalli, 1989
- Otiorhynchus altaepeniae Meregalli, 1986
- Otiorhynchus analis A. Solari & F. Solari, 1922
- Otiorhynchus andarensis Reitter, 1913
- Otiorhynchus arcticus (Fabricius, 1780)
- Otiorhynchus baraudi Tempère, 1977
- Otiorhynchus bigoti Tempère & Ponel, 1983
- Otiorhynchus caesipes Rey, 1859
- Otiorhynchus chobauti Hustache, 1920
- Otiorhynchus coachei Delaunay, 2005
- Otiorhynchus collectivus Reitter, 1890
- Otiorhynchus corsicus Fairmaire, 1859
- Otiorhynchus cupreosparsus Fairmaire, 1859
- Otiorhynchus daphnes Meregalli, 1986
- Otiorhynchus demandae Meregalli, 1986
- Otiorhynchus dentipes Gräells, 1858
- Otiorhynchus ehlersi Stierlin, 1881
- Otiorhynchus fulvipes Gyllenhal, 1834
- Otiorhynchus gertraudae Zumpt, 1934
- Otiorhynchus getschmanni Stierlin, 1880
- Otiorhynchus glabricollis Boheman, 1842
- Otiorhynchus hirticulus Meregalli, 1992
- Otiorhynchus johannis Stierlin, 1881
- Otiorhynchus malefidus Gyllenhal, 1834
- Otiorhynchus melanopus Zumpt, 1934
- Otiorhynchus morio (Fabricius, 1781)
- Otiorhynchus nimius Meregalli, 1986
- Otiorhynchus noui Fairmaire, 1862
- Otiorhynchus oliveri Meregalli, 1992
- Otiorhynchus pascuorum (Peyerimhoff, 1901)
- Otiorhynchus patruelis Stierlin, 1861
- Otiorhynchus peyerimhoffi Hustache, 1920
- Otiorhynchus pourtoyi Tempère, 1972
- Otiorhynchus praecellens Stierlin, 1886
- Otiorhynchus putoni Stierlin, 1891
- Otiorhynchus reynosae C. N. F. Brisout de Barneville, 1866
- Otiorhynchus sagax Reitter, 1915
- Otiorhynchus seriehispidus Stierlin, 1872
- Otiorhynchus simoni Bedel, 1874
- Otiorhynchus sparsiridis Reitter, 1890
- Otiorhynchus sylvestris Chevrolat, 1866
- Otiorhynchus urbionensis Meregalli, 1989
- Otiorhynchus uyttenboogaarti Zumpt, 1936
- Otiorhynchus validus Stierlin, 1881
- Otiorhynchus weiratherianus Lona, 1937

== Subgenus Pinduchus ==
- Otiorhynchus kuschakewitschi Stierlin, 1883
- Otiorhynchus tarphiderus Reitter, 1914

== Subgenus Pirostovedus ==
- Otiorhynchus bosnicus Stierlin, 1888
- Otiorhynchus obtusidens Apfelbeck, 1928
- Otiorhynchus retifer Apfelbeck, 1928

== Subgenus Pliadonus ==
- Otiorhynchus abagoensis Reitter, 1888
- Otiorhynchus brachialis Boheman, 1842 - Russia (Karachay-Cherkesia, Krasnodar Krai, Adygea)
- Otiorhynchus ciscaucasicus Korotyaev, 1992
- Otiorhynchus decoratus Stierlin, 1877
- Otiorhynchus dentitibia Reitter, 1888
- Otiorhynchus dispar Stierlin, 1879 - Caucasus (?)
- Otiorhynchus dolmenicus Davidian & Savitsky, 2006 - Russia (Krasnodar Krai)
- Otiorhynchus frater Stierlin, 1861
- Otiorhynchus gajirbeki Davidian & Savitsky, 2006 - Russia (Ingushetia)
- Otiorhynchus gegicus Davidian & Savitsky, 2006 - Georgia (Abkhazia)
- Otiorhynchus granulatissimus Reitter, 1914
- Otiorhynchus helenae Reitter, 1914
- Otiorhynchus impressiceps Reitter, 1888 - Caucasus (?)
- Otiorhynchus isaevi Davidian & Geliskhanova, 2006
- Otiorhynchus longipes Stierlin, 1872 - Russia (North Osetia-Alania)
- Otiorhynchus mingrelicus Davidian & Savitsky, 2006 - Georgia (Abkhazia, Svaneti, Mingrelia)
- Otiorhynchus omanensis Magnano, 2002
- Otiorhynchus osseticus Korotyaev, 1992
- Otiorhynchus pseudobrachialis Reitter, 1914
- Otiorhynchus reitteri Stierlin, 1876
- Otiorhynchus schamylianus Reitter, 1888 - Western and Central Caucasus
- Otiorhynchus starcki Retowski, 1885
- Otiorhynchus tbatanicus Reitter, 1914 - Georgia (Kakheti)
- Otiorhynchus zherikhini Davidian & Savitsky, 2006

== Subgenus Pocodalemes ==
- Otiorhynchus brevipilosus Białooki, 2017 - Turkey (Karaman, Konya)
- Otiorhynchus frivaldszkyi Rosenhauer, 1856
- Otiorhynchus lilligi Keskin & Cevik, 2007 - Turkey (Izmir)
- Otiorhynchus subbidentatus Stierlin, 1895 - Georgia (Abkhazia)
- Otiorhynchus vitis Gyllenhal, 1834 - Caucasus (?), Ukraine (Crimea) (?)
- Otiorhynchus yurii Savitsky & Davidian, 2006 - Russia (Krasnodar Krai)

== Subgenus Pocusogetus ==
- Otiorhynchus albinae Formánek, 1922
- Otiorhynchus fischtensis Reitter, 1889
- Otiorhynchus gusakovi Savitsky & Davidian, 2007
- Otiorhynchus obsulcatus Stierlin, 1861
- Otiorhynchus rosti Stierlin, 1891
- Otiorhynchus schapovalovi Davidian & Yunakov, 2002

== Subgenus Podonebistus ==
- Otiorhynchus acatium Gyllenhal, 1834
- Otiorhynchus alaianus Stierlin, 1886
- Otiorhynchus amissus Reitter, 1914
- Otiorhynchus bardus Boheman, 1842
- Otiorhynchus beroni (Angelov, 1985) - Greece, Bulgaria (eastern Rhodopes)
- Otiorhynchus chalciditanus Reitter, 1914
- Otiorhynchus curiosus Białooki, 2017 - Greece (Evia Island)
- Otiorhynchus discretus Stierlin, 1861 - western Turkey
- Otiorhynchus gueorgievi (Angelov, 1985) - Bulgaria (Stara Planina)
- Otiorhynchus holdhausi A. Solari & F. Solari, 1913
- Otiorhynchus janovskii Korotyaev, 1990
- Otiorhynchus jovis Miller, 1862 - Greece (Kefalonia)
- Otiorhynchus knutelskii Legalov, 2021
- Otiorhynchus lodosi A. Hoffmann, 1954
- Otiorhynchus pavelangelovi Guéorguiev & Magnano, 2007 - Bulgaria
- Otiorhynchus perdixoides Reitter, 1914
- Otiorhynchus phasma Rottenberg, 1872
- Otiorhynchus prolongatus Stierlin, 1861
- Otiorhynchus prostratus Heyden, 1886
- Otiorhynchus pseudomecops Reitter, 1914 - Georgia (Samtskhe–Javakheti)
- Otiorhynchus rhinorostris Białooki, 2017 - Greece (Central Greece)
- Otiorhynchus schuhmacheri Stierlin, 1883 - Lebanon, Syria
- Otiorhynchus trichopterus Bialooki, 2015 - Greece (Crete)
- Otiorhynchus ursus Gebler, 1844
- Otiorhynchus zoiai Magnano, 2005

== Subgenus Podorhynchus ==
- Otiorhynchus cylindricus Stierlin, 1877 - Georgia (South Osetia)
- Otiorhynchus fortiscapus Arnoldi, 1972 -
- Otiorhynchus glolae Arnoldi, 1972
- Otiorhynchus korotyaevi Davidian & L. Gültekin, 2006
- Otiorhynchus ritsae Arnoldi, 1972
- Otiorhynchus subpallelus Stierlin, 1893 - Georgia (Abkhazia)

== Subgenus Podoropelmus ==
- Otiorhynchus albidus Stierlin, 1861
- Otiorhynchus alius Magnano, 1999
- Otiorhynchus coarctatus Stierlin, 1861
- Otiorhynchus crassicollis Stierlin, 1861
- Otiorhynchus diversus Magnano, 1999
- Otiorhynchus fullo (Schrank, 1781)
- Otiorhynchus georgianus Magnano, 1999
- Otiorhynchus gerdi Colonnelli, 2022
- Otiorhynchus goetzi Angelov, 1964
- Otiorhynchus granosus Magnano, 1999
- Otiorhynchus imparisetosus Smreczyński, 1977
- Otiorhynchus incurvipes Magnano, 1999
- Otiorhynchus juglandis Apfelbeck, 1896
- Otiorhynchus korgei Smreczyński, 1970
- Otiorhynchus libertoi Magnano, 1999
- Otiorhynchus metsovensis Magnano, 1999
- Otiorhynchus minutegranulatus Magnano, 1999
- Otiorhynchus pauxillus Rosenhauer, 1847
- Otiorhynchus prioniensis Magnano, 1999
- Otiorhynchus pseudosuramensis Magnano, 1999
- Otiorhynchus rotundus Marseul, 1873
- Otiorhynchus scopularis Hochhuth, 1847
- Otiorhynchus smreczynskii Cmoluch, 1968
- Otiorhynchus suramensiformis Magnano, 1999
- Otiorhynchus suramensis Reitter, 1914

== Subgenus Pontotiorhynchus ==
- Otiorhynchus achaeus Stierlin, 1861
- Otiorhynchus asphaltinus Germar, 1823
- Otiorhynchus atronitens Formánek, 1925
- Otiorhynchus brauneri Smirnov, 1910
- Otiorhynchus edithae Reitter, 1887
- Otiorhynchus peregrinus Stierlin, 1861

== Subgenus Postaremus ==
- Otiorhynchus dinaricus Apfelbeck, 1899
- Otiorhynchus necessarius Stierlin, 1861
- Otiorhynchus nodosus (O. F. Müller, 1764)
- Otiorhynchus plebejus Stierlin, 1861
- Otiorhynchus schmidtii Stierlin, 1861
- Otiorhynchus tomentifer Boheman, 1842

== Subgenus Postupatus ==
- Otiorhynchus brusinae Stierlin, 1888

== Subgenus Presolanus ==
- Otiorhynchus diottii Pesarini, 2001

== Subgenus Prilisvanus ==
- Otiorhynchus alpigradus Miller, 1859
- Otiorhynchus asplenii Miller, 1868
- Otiorhynchus cirrorrhynchoides Reitter, 1912
- Otiorhynchus confinis Frivaldszky, 1875
- Otiorhynchus corvus Boheman, 1842
- Otiorhynchus cymophanus Germar, 1839
- Otiorhynchus demirkapensis Apfelbeck, 1899
- Otiorhynchus dives Germar, 1839
- Otiorhynchus fussianus Csiki, 1901
- Otiorhynchus fussii Küster, 1849
- Otiorhynchus gemmatus (Scopoli, 1763)
- Otiorhynchus germanni Alonso-Zarazaga, 2013
- Otiorhynchus granicollis Boheman, 1842
- Otiorhynchus krattereri Boheman, 1842
- Otiorhynchus longiventris Küster, 1849
- Otiorhynchus malissorum Apfelbeck, 1918
- Otiorhynchus marthae Reitter, 1889
- Otiorhynchus millerianus Reitter, 1914
- Otiorhynchus mocsaryi Csiki, 1899
- Otiorhynchus obliteratus F. Solari, 1943
- Otiorhynchus obsidianus Boheman, 1842
- Otiorhynchus opulentus Germar, 1836
- Otiorhynchus parreyssii Stierlin, 1861
- Otiorhynchus piceus Stierlin, 1895
- Otiorhynchus punctifrons Stierlin, 1888
- Otiorhynchus riessi Fuss, 1868
- Otiorhynchus simplicatus Stierlin, 1861
- Otiorhynchus sulcifrons Gyllenhal, 1834
- Otiorhynchus treskaensis Voss, 1964
- Otiorhynchus wolfi Braun, 1998

== Subgenus Prodeminus ==
- Otiorhynchus fernandoi Magnano, 2001
- Otiorhynchus maxillosus Gyllenhal, 1834
- Otiorhynchus osellanus Smreczyński, 1977
- Otiorhynchus ropotamus Angelov, 1974

== Subgenus Prohanibotus ==
- Otiorhynchus auripes Stierlin, 1875 - northern Iran (?)

== Subgenus Protarammichnus ==
- Otiorhynchus lindbergi Voss, 1960

== Subgenus Prototis ==
- Otiorhynchus michnoi Korotyaev, 1996
- Otiorhynchus popovi Faust, 1888

== Subgenus Provalidus ==
- Otiorhynchus alpicola Boheman, 1842
- Otiorhynchus coriarius Stierlin, 1861
- Otiorhynchus fagniezi Ruter, 1945
- Otiorhynchus farinosus Formánek, 1925
- Otiorhynchus korgei Smreczyński, 1970
- Otiorhynchus liliputanus Apfelbeck, 1908
- Otiorhynchus merditanus Apfelbeck, 1907
- Otiorhynchus moestus Gyllenhal, 1834
- Otiorhynchus pedemontanus Stierlin, 1861
- Otiorhynchus piliger Apfelbeck, 1896
- Otiorhynchus rugifrons (Gyllenhal, 1813)
- Otiorhynchus sitonoides Apfelbeck, 1907
- Otiorhynchus trichographus Stierlin, 1861

== Subgenus Pseudocryphiphorus ==
- Otiorhynchus argillosus Hochhuth, 1851
- Otiorhynchus babughanicus Yunakov, 2003
- Otiorhynchus chrysostictus Gyllenhal, 1834
- Otiorhynchus histrio Gyllenhal, 1834
- Otiorhynchus histrioides Reitter, 1912
- Otiorhynchus infensus Faust, 1888
- Otiorhynchus matisi Korotyaev, 2020
- Otiorhynchus orbicularis (Herbst, 1795)
- Otiorhynchus pullus Gyllenhal, 1834
- Otiorhynchus semitarius Reitter, 1913
- Otiorhynchus zebei Stierlin, 1861

== Subgenus Pseudoprovadilus ==
- Otiorhynchus atrohippus Davidian & Yunakov, 2002
- Otiorhynchus buccatus Davidian & Yunakov, 2002
- Otiorhynchus carbonarius Hochhuth, 1847
- Otiorhynchus carbonicolor Reitter, 1914
- Otiorhynchus gratshevi Savitsky & Davidian, 2006 - Russia (Krasnodar Krai)
- Otiorhynchus henrici Arzanov, 2004
- Otiorhynchus obcaecatus Schoenherr, 1832 - Russia (Caucasus), Georgia (?)
- Otiorhynchus paralleliceps Reitter, 1913
- Otiorhynchus subcoriaceus Reitter, 1882
- Otiorhynchus verrucicollis Stierlin, 1861
- Otiorhynchus viridiporus Davidian & Yunakov, 2002

== Subgenus Pseudotiorhynchus ==
- Otiorhynchus arnoldianus Nasreddinov, 1976
- Otiorhynchus artemisiae Savitsky, 2020
- Otiorhynchus atamuradovi Davidian & Korotyaev, 2012
- Otiorhynchus balchaschensis Bajtenov, 1974
- Otiorhynchus berberidis Savitsky, 2020
- Otiorhynchus binaludus Savitsky, 2019
- Otiorhynchus capitatus (Magnano, 2004)
- Otiorhynchus christophi Stierlin, 1876
- Otiorhynchus conicirostris Stierlin, 1886
- Otiorhynchus demavendus Savitsky, 2019
- Otiorhynchus iranensis Magnano, 2004
- Otiorhynchus jelineki (Magnano, 2004)
- Otiorhynchus karagurensis Savitsky, 2020
- Otiorhynchus karakalensis Davidian & Savitsky, 2015
- Otiorhynchus khorasanus Savitsky & Davidian, 2015
- Otiorhynchus khurshedi Davidian & Korotyaev, 2012
- Otiorhynchus konstantini Davidian & Savitsky, 2015
- Otiorhynchus kopetdagicus Savitsky & Davidian, 2015
- Otiorhynchus lukarevskayae Davidian, 2015
- Otiorhynchus morosus Faust, 1889
- Otiorhynchus muratovi Savitsky & Davidian, 2015
- Otiorhynchus napolovi Savitsky, 2020
- Otiorhynchus olegi Davidian & Korotyaev, 2012
- Otiorhynchus parartemisiae Savitsky, 2020
- Otiorhynchus podlussanyi (Magnano, 2004)
- Otiorhynchus ruminalis (Faust, 1894)
- Otiorhynchus saraevi Davidian & Korotyaev, 2012
- Otiorhynchus schmorli Stierlin, 1876
- Otiorhynchus shakhensis Savitsky & Davidian, 2015
- Otiorhynchus shakhvarensis Savitsky, 2020

== Subgenus Pterygodontoides ==
- Otiorhynchus triantisi (Alziar & Makris, 2006)

== Subgenus Pterygodontus ==
- Otiorhynchus anabolicus Białooki, 2017 - Turkey (Antalya, Hatay
- Otiorhynchus atticus Stierlin, 1887
- Otiorhynchus bleusei Faust, 1899 - Greece (Rhodes)
- Otiorhynchus casalinii Bialooki & Kakiopoulos, 2017
- Otiorhynchus dawricus Lona, 1931
- Otiorhynchus halimeae Białooki, Sabancı & Aslan, 2023
- Otiorhynchus muglae Magnano, 2005
- Otiorhynchus naldoekensis Magnano, 2005 - Turkey (Mersin)
- Otiorhynchus nefandus Faust, 1888 - Ukraine (Crimea), Turkey (Anatolia)
- Otiorhynchus pulcher Białooki & Fremuth, 2017 - Turkey (Antalya)

== Subgenus Rimenostolus ==
- Otiorhynchus avaricus Davidian & Savitsky, 2005
- Otiorhynchus eugeni Reitter, 1896
- Otiorhynchus gamzatovi Korotyaev & Davidian, 2005
- Otiorhynchus globicollis Hochhuth, 1847
- Otiorhynchus pilifer Stierlin, 1896
- Otiorhynchus semiopacus Reitter, 1914

== Subgenus Rosvalestus ==
- Otiorhynchus globus Boheman, 1842

== Subgenus Rusnepranus ==
- Otiorhynchus bergamascus Stierlin, 1894
- Otiorhynchus heerii Stierlin, 1858
- Otiorhynchus permundus Reitter, 1913
- Otiorhynchus valtellinus K. Daniel & J. Daniel, 1891

== Subgenus Satnalistus ==
- Otiorhynchus duinensis Germar, 1823
- Otiorhynchus novaki J. Müller, 1922
- Otiorhynchus novellae Lona, 1925
- Otiorhynchus paulinus Lona, 1925
- Otiorhynchus rhinocerulus Penecke, 1928
- Otiorhynchus signatipennis Gyllenhal, 1834
- Otiorhynchus stenorostris Apfelbeck, 1898
- Otiorhynchus virginalis Apfelbeck, 1922

== Subgenus Spodocellinus ==
- Otiorhynchus subpubescens Stierlin, 1894

== Subgenus Stierlinellus ==
- Otiorhynchus rotundicollis Stierlin, 1876

== Subgenus Stupamacus ==
- Otiorhynchus angusticollis Boheman, 1842
- Otiorhynchus anomalus F. Solari, 1937
- Otiorhynchus arnoldii Iablokoff-Khnzorian, 1959
- Otiorhynchus biformatus Mazur, 1993
- Otiorhynchus blanchardi Apfelbeck, 1896
- Otiorhynchus clavalis Apfelbeck, 1922
- Otiorhynchus commixtus Bajtenov, 1974
- Otiorhynchus danieli Apfelbeck, 1896
- Otiorhynchus dorymeroides F. Solari, 1937
- Otiorhynchus erroneus Faust, 1887
- Otiorhynchus falsarius Reitter, 1912
- Otiorhynchus fleischeri Stierlin, 1896
- Otiorhynchus fodori Mesaroš, 1996
- Otiorhynchus hospitus Reitter, 1912
- Otiorhynchus jakupicensis Mesaroš, 1991
- Otiorhynchus joakimoffi Apfelbeck, 1932
- Otiorhynchus krueperi Stierlin, 1887
- Otiorhynchus lithantracius Boheman, 1842
- Otiorhynchus macedonicus Reitter, 1913
- Otiorhynchus maculiscapus Reitter, 1914
- Otiorhynchus perrinae Bajtenov, 1980
- Otiorhynchus politus Gyllenhal, 1834
- Otiorhynchus problematicus Mesaroš, 1996
- Otiorhynchus proletarius Boheman, 1842
- Otiorhynchus puncticornis Gyllenhal, 1834 - Caucasus (?), Ukraine (Crimea) (?)
- Otiorhynchus regliae F. Solari, 1937
- Otiorhynchus russicus Stierlin, 1883
- Otiorhynchus scintillus Reitter, 1912
- Otiorhynchus shardaghensis Apfelbeck, 1908
- Otiorhynchus siccensis Peyerimhoff, 1930
- Otiorhynchus tomoricensis Lona, 1922
- Otiorhynchus turcicus Arnoldi, 1963
- Otiorhynchus winkleri F. Solari, 1937
- Otiorhynchus yakovlevi Legalov, 2020
- Otiorhynchus zaisanicus Bajtenov, 1974

== Subgenus Sulcorhynchus ==
- Otiorhynchus circassicus Reitter, 1888 - Russia (Karachay-Cherkessia)
- Otiorhynchus emrei Avgin & Colonnelli, 2011 - Turkey (Hatay)
- Otiorhynchus inclinataesetis Magnano, 1999 - Russia (Karachay-Cherkessia)
- Otiorhynchus planipennis Magnano, 1999 - Russia (Karachay-Cherkessia)
- Otiorhynchus pseudocircassicus Magnano, 1999 - Russia (Karachay-Cherkessia)
- Otiorhynchus teberdensis Reitter, 1909 - Russia (Karachay-Cherkessia)

== Subgenus Tecutinus ==
- Otiorhynchus adopertus Białooki, 2017 - Turkey (Sivas)
- Otiorhynchus brevicornis Boheman, 1842
- Otiorhynchus caesareus K. Daniel, 1906
- Otiorhynchus catonii Lona, 1943
- Otiorhynchus charleshuberi Germann, 2016
- Otiorhynchus corpusculus Białooki, 2017 - Turkey (Afyonkarahisar)
- Otiorhynchus crassicornis Gyllenhal, 1839
- Otiorhynchus cribripennis Hochhuth, 1851
- Otiorhynchus crinitellus K. Daniel & J. Daniel, 1902
- Otiorhynchus escherichi Reitter, 1898
- Otiorhynchus flavosetosus Białooki, 2017 - Turkey (Karaman, Konya)
- Otiorhynchus fremuthi Braun, 1989
- Otiorhynchus gultekini Germann, 2017
- Otiorhynchus gymnopterus K. Daniel & J. Daniel, 1902
- Otiorhynchus heinzianus Braun, 1988
- Otiorhynchus ikisderensis Smreczyński, 1970
- Otiorhynchus implicatus Białooki, 2017 - Turkey (Antalya)
- Otiorhynchus karagolensis Smreczyński, 1970
- Otiorhynchus kindermanni Stierlin, 1861
- Otiorhynchus lacunosus Białooki, 2017 - Turkey (Kütahya, Balıkesir)
- Otiorhynchus latifrons Stierlin, 1890
- Otiorhynchus lefkaoriensis Germann & Colonnelli, 2015
- Otiorhynchus marggii Germann, 2017 - Turkey (Antalya)
- Otiorhynchus nigrosetosus Białooki, 2017 - Turkey (Kırşehir)
- Otiorhynchus paracrinitellus Braun, 1989
- Otiorhynchus pseudocribripennis Braun, 1988
- Otiorhynchus riedeli Braun, 1989
- Otiorhynchus salbakosanus Lona, 1943
- Otiorhynchus sculptipterus Białooki, 2017 - Turkey (Ankara)
- Otiorhynchus soganliensis Smreczyński, 1977
- Otiorhynchus staveni Braun, 2000
- Otiorhynchus tmolosensis Lona, 1943
- Otiorhynchus torulensis Benedikt, 2000

== Subgenus Thalycrynchus ==
- Otiorhynchus adonis Apfelbeck, 1906
- Otiorhynchus cephalonicus Pic, 1902
- Otiorhynchus conjungens Apfelbeck, 1918
- Otiorhynchus perdix (Olivier, 1807)
- Otiorhynchus prokletiensis Apfelbeck, 1918

== Subgenus Tithonus ==
- Otiorhynchus chrysocomus Germar, 1823

== Subgenus Tournieria ==
- Otiorhynchus adanensis Smreczyński, 1977
- Otiorhynchus anadolicus Boheman, 1842
- Otiorhynchus annaerosae Magnano, 2005
- Otiorhynchus brenskei Reitter, 1884
- Otiorhynchus callicnemis Apfelbeck, 1919
- Otiorhynchus emgei Stierlin, 1887
- Otiorhynchus europaeus Stierlin, 1883 - western Turkey (?)
- Otiorhynchus lauraecristinae Magnano, 2005
- Otiorhynchus lubriculus Faust, 1890
- Otiorhynchus lutzi Magnano, 2006 - Turkey (Erzincan)
- Otiorhynchus meregallii Magnano, 1977
- Otiorhynchus omonimus F. Solari, 1950
- Otiorhynchus osmanlis Stierlin, 1883 - Caucasus (?)
- Otiorhynchus othryades Reitter, 1914
- Otiorhynchus pilosellus Apfelbeck, 1919
- Otiorhynchus scabriventris Białooki, 2020
- Otiorhynchus sengleti Smreczynski, 1977
- Otiorhynchus teucrus Reitter, 1914
- Otiorhynchus veluchianus Apfelbeck, 1912
- Otiorhynchus vossianus Magnano, 2001

== Subgenus Trichosmobodes ==
- Otiorhynchus lasiosemius Bajtenov, 1978
- Otiorhynchus lukjanovitshi Korotyaev, 2021
- Otiorhynchus obscurus Gyllenhal, 1834
- Otiorhynchus perplexus Gyllenhal, 1834

== Subgenus Troglonamertanus ==
- Otiorhynchus golovatchi Davidian & Savitsky, 2006 - Azerbaijan
- Otiorhynchus gusarovi Davidian & Savitsky, 2006 - Georgia (Abkhazia)
- Otiorhynchus inaliparum (Rost, 1893) - Russia (Caucasus), Georgia (Abkhazia)
- Otiorhynchus myops (Reitter, 1882) - Caucasus
- Otiorhynchus victori Davidian & Savitsky, 2006 - Georgia (Abkhazia)

== Subgenus Troglorhynchus ==
- Otiorhynchus anophthalmoides Reitter, 1914 - Austria, Croatia, Italy, Slovenia
- Otiorhynchus anophthalmus (F. Schmidt, 1854) - Austria, Croatia, Italy, Slovenia
- Otiorhynchus bericus Magnano, 1977 - Italy (Trento)
- Otiorhynchus prolixus Rosenhauer, 1847 - Germany, Italy (Trentino Alto Adige)
- Otiorhynchus radjai Di Marco & G. Osella, 2002 - Croatia (Vis Island)
- Otiorhynchus zanoni Magrini & Benelli, 2021

== Subgenus Udonedus ==
- Otiorhynchus aibgae Davidian & Yunakov, 2002 - Russia (Krasnodar Krai)
- Otiorhynchus alexeevi Korotyaev & Davidian, 2002
- Otiorhynchus diabolicus Reitter, 1895
- Otiorhynchus galinae Arzanov, 2002 - Russia (Krasnodar Krai, Adygea)
- Otiorhynchus koenigi Faust, 1888
- Otiorhynchus kovali Davidian & Yunakov, 2002 - Georgia (Abkhazia)
- Otiorhynchus leventi Davidian & Yunakov, 2002
- Otiorhynchus makarovi Savitsky & Davidian, 2006 - Georgia (Abkhazia)

== Subgenus Ulozenus ==
- Otiorhynchus funebris Apfelbeck, 1922
- Otiorhynchus infernalis (Germar, 1817)

== Subgenus Urorrhynchus ==
- Otiorhynchus nobilis Germar, 1823
- Otiorhynchus sabulosus Gyllenhal, 1834
- Otiorhynchus sensitivus (Scopoli, 1763)
- Otiorhynchus stichopterus Apfelbeck, 1911
- Otiorhynchus truncatus Stierlin, 1861

== Subgenus Vedopranus ==
- Otiorhynchus luigimagnanoi Davidian & Savitsky, 2006 - Russia (Adygea)
- Otiorhynchus panfilovi Savitsky, 2021
- Otiorhynchus retowskii Reitter, 1885 - Russia (Adygea, Krasnodar Krai)
- Otiorhynchus tatarchani Reitter, 1882

== Subgenus Vicoranius ==
- Otiorhynchus fusciventris Fuss, 1868

== Subgenus Viroprius ==
- Otiorhynchus asiaticus Stierlin, 1861
- Otiorhynchus formicarius Stierlin, 1861
- Otiorhynchus hirsutus Stierlin, 1880
- Otiorhynchus kirschi Marseul, 1873
- Otiorhynchus saevus Boheman, 1842

== Subgenus Zadrehus ==
- Otiorhynchus atroapterus (De Geer, 1775) - Coastal Northern and Western Europe

== Subgenus Zariedus ==
- Otiorhynchus bajtenowi Angelov, 1976
- Otiorhynchus boroldaicus Bajtenov, 1974
- Otiorhynchus haedillus Reitter, 1914
- Otiorhynchus hastilis Reitter, 1914
- Otiorhynchus hystericus Faust, 1892
- Otiorhynchus iliensis Bajtenov, 1974
- Otiorhynchus maschaticus Bajtenov, 1974
- Otiorhynchus piliporus Reitter, 1914
- Otiorhynchus saturnus Reitter, 1914
- Otiorhynchus secundarius Reitter, 1914
- Otiorhynchus sedulus Faust, 1894
- Otiorhynchus sugatensis Bajtenov, 1974

== Subgenus Zavodesus ==
- Otiorhynchus bodemeyeri K. Daniel & J. Daniel, 1902
- Otiorhynchus glabellus Rosenhauer, 1847
- Otiorhynchus irregularis Stierlin, 1872
- Otiorhynchus miser Kirsch, 1880 - Turkey (?)

== Subgenus Zelotomelus ==
- Otiorhynchus erinaceus Stierlin, 1876 - Russia (Caucasus)
- Otiorhynchus parerinaceus Davidian & Savitsky, 2002 - Russia (Krasnodar Krai)

== Subgenus Zustalestus ==
- Otiorhynchus brevipilis Apfelbeck, 1919
- Otiorhynchus consobrinus Reitter, 1913
- Otiorhynchus rugosostriatus (Goeze, 1777) - Europe, Portugal (Azores), North Africa (?), introduced to the United States, Canada (British Columbia, Alberta), Chile, Argentina, Australia (New South Wales, Victoria, South Australia, Tasmania), New Zealand and French Southern and Antarctic Lands (?)

== Incertae sedis ==
- Otiorhynchus amoenus Faust, 1886
- Otiorhynchus civicus Gistel, 1857
- Otiorhynchus clavicrus Marseul, 1878 - Turkey (Trabzon)
- Otiorhynchus conspersus (Herbst, 1795)
- Otiorhynchus conspicabilis Faldemann, 1838
- Otiorhynchus coriaceus (Panzer, 1795)
- Otiorhynchus delatus Faust, 1899
- Otiorhynchus dubius (Ström, 1783)
- Otiorhynchus fengaricus Białooki, 2024
- Otiorhynchus fominykhi Davidian, 2024
- Otiorhynchus hirtellus (Reiche, 1849)
- Otiorhynchus hochhuthi Marseul, 1872
- Otiorhynchus intercalaris Boheman, 1842
- Otiorhynchus iratus Reitter, 1913
- Otiorhynchus karasevi Davidian, 2024
- Otiorhynchus karataviensis Bajtenov, 1974
- Otiorhynchus keskini Davidian, 2024 - Turkey (Adıyaman)
- Otiorhynchus lothari Alonso-Zarazaga, 2013
- Otiorhynchus maderi Formánek, 1920
- Otiorhynchus malyi (Obenberger, 1914)
- Otiorhynchus maurus (Schrank, 1781)
- Otiorhynchus meschniggi Petri, 1928
- Otiorhynchus milleri Stierlin, 1862
- Otiorhynchus mucronatus (Paykull, 1792)
- Otiorhynchus neslihanae Davidian, 2024
- Otiorhynchus ovinus Penecke, 1928
- Otiorhynchus petiginosus Stierlin, 1861
- Otiorhynchus pimelioides (Olivier, 1807)
- Otiorhynchus pinetorum (Schrank, 1781)
- Otiorhynchus piperatus (Grimmer, 1841)
- Otiorhynchus prasolovi Davidian & Arzanov, 2025
- Otiorhynchus puberulus Hochhuth, 1851
- Otiorhynchus pubescens Boheman, 1837
- Otiorhynchus sciaphilus Gistel, 1857
- Otiorhynchus seductor Stierlin, 1861
- Otiorhynchus shtepaneki Davidian, 2019
- Otiorhynchus striolaticeps G.A.K. Marshall, 1916
- Otiorhynchus stussineri Stierlin, 1880
- Otiorhynchus styriacus (Grimmer, 1841)
- Otiorhynchus subdepressus Stierlin, 1872
- Otiorhynchus tenuis Stierlin, 1883
- Otiorhynchus thracicus Stierlin, 1861
- Otiorhynchus vailatianus Osella - Greece (Aitoloakarnania)
- Otiorhynchus vellicatus Germar, 1823
- Otiorhynchus vodenensis Formánek, 1920

== Sources ==
- "Otiorhynchus Germar, 1822". BioLib.
- "Otiorhynchus Germar, 1822". Catalogue of Life.
- "Catalogue of selected seevils of the Palearctic region". Curcipal.site.at.
- Morrone, Juan J.; Hlaváč, Peter (2017). "Checklist of the micro- and anophthalmic soil-dwelling weevils of the world (Coleoptera: Curculionidae)". Zootaxa. 4239 (1): 1–102. doi:10.11646/zootaxa.4239.1.1.
- Davidian, G.E.; Savitsky, V.Yu. (2005). "К познанию долгоносиков рода Otiorhynchus Germar (Coleoptera: Curculionidae) Кавказа и сопредельных регионов" (PDF). Russian Entomological Journal (in Russian). 14 (4): 283–328.
- Magnano, Luigi (2006). "Revisione di Otiorhynchus (Meriplodus) Reitter, 1912 (Coleoptera Curculionidae)" (PDF). Atti dell'Accademia Roveretana degli Agiati. 8 (in Italian). 6 (B): 215–243.
- Białooki, Piotr (December 2017). "On new taxa of Otiorhynchus Germar, 1822 (Coleoptera: Curculionidae: Entiminae: Otiorhynchini) from Greece and Turkey". Polish Journal of Entomology. 86 (4). doi:10.1515/pjen-2017-0019.
- Casalini, Roberto; Colonnelli, Enzo (2019). "Notes on some species of Otiorhynchus Germar, 1822 sensu strictu, with new synonymies and a neotype designation (Coleoptera: Curculionidae)" (PDF). Gredleriana. 19: 193–200. doi:10.5281/zenodo.3565327.
- Osella, Giuseppe; Zuppa, Anna Maria (1994). "Gli Otiorhynchus Germar, 1824 del Monte Nerone e montagne viciniori (Appennino umbro-marchigiano) (Coleoptera, Curculionidae)" (PDF). Biogeographia (in Italian). 17: 367–397.
- Bulletin de la Société Entomologique Suisse (in German). Vol. 6. Huber & Comp. (Hans Körber). 1884.
- Entomologische Monatsblätter (in German). Vol. 1. G. Kraatz. 1876.
- Davidian, G.E.; Arzanov, Yu.G. (2024). "Новые данные по систематике и морфологии долгоносиков рода Otiorhynchus Germar, 1822 (Coleoptera: Curculionidae: Entiminae) с описанием нового подвида из подрода Pocodalemes Reitter, 1912" (PDF). Кавказский Энтомологический Бюллетень (in Russian). 20 (1): 9–23.
- Magnano, Luigi (2006). "Tre nuove specie di Otiorhynchus Germar, 1822 di Turchia, Iran e Marocco (Coleoptera, Curculionidae)" (PDF). Atti dell'Accademia Roveretana degli Agiati. 8 (in Italian). 6 (B): 245–252.
- Avgin, Sakine Serap; Colonnelli, Enzo (2011). "A new species of Otiorhynchus Germar (Coleoptera: Curculionidae) from Turkey". Türkiye Entomoloji Dergisi. 35 (2): 295–302. ISSN 1010-6960.
- Davidian, G.E.; Savitsky, Vladimir (2012). "A review of weevils of the subgenus Hanibotus Reitter, 1912 of the genus Otiorhynchus Germar, 1822 (Coleoptera: Curculionidae)". Caucasian Entomological Bulletin (in Russian). 8 (1): 71–99. doi:10.23885/1814-3326-2012-8-1-71-99.
