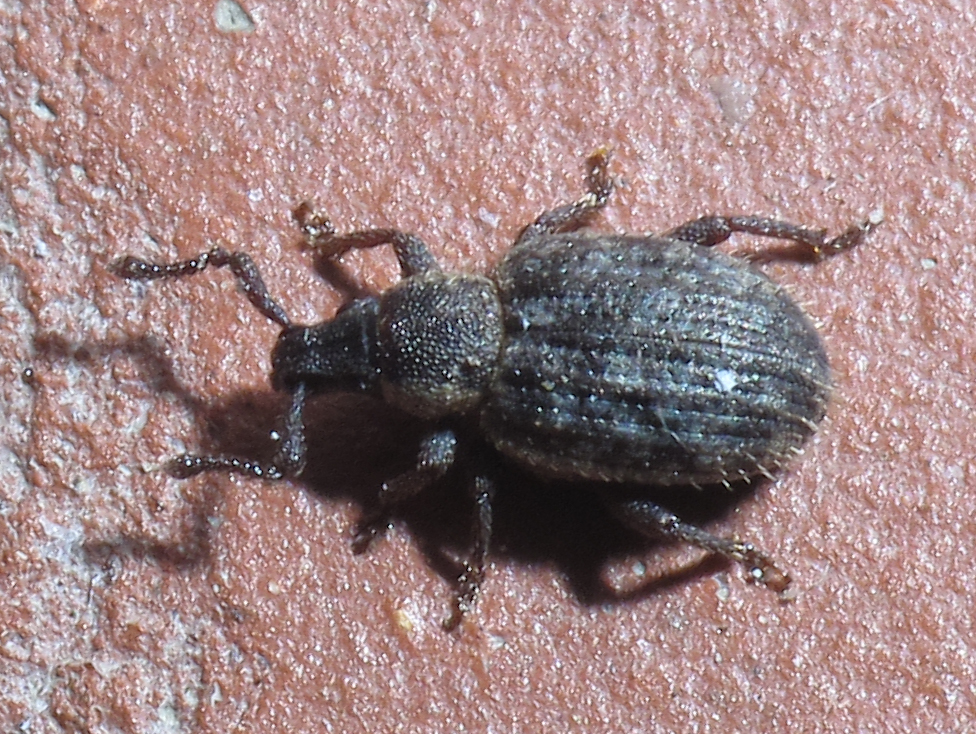
- Cathormiocerus

Scientific classification
- Domain: Eukaryota
- Kingdom: Animalia
- Phylum: Arthropoda
- Class: Insecta
- Order: Coleoptera
- Suborder: Polyphaga
- Infraorder: Cucujiformia
- Family: Curculionidae
- Subfamily: Entiminae
- Tribe: Trachyphloeini; Gistel, 1848

Subtribes
- Trachyphilina; Trachyphloeina

= Trachyphloeini =

Tribe of beetles

Trachyphloeini is a tribe of broad-nosed weevils in the beetle family Curculionidae. There are more than 25 genera in Trachyphloeini.

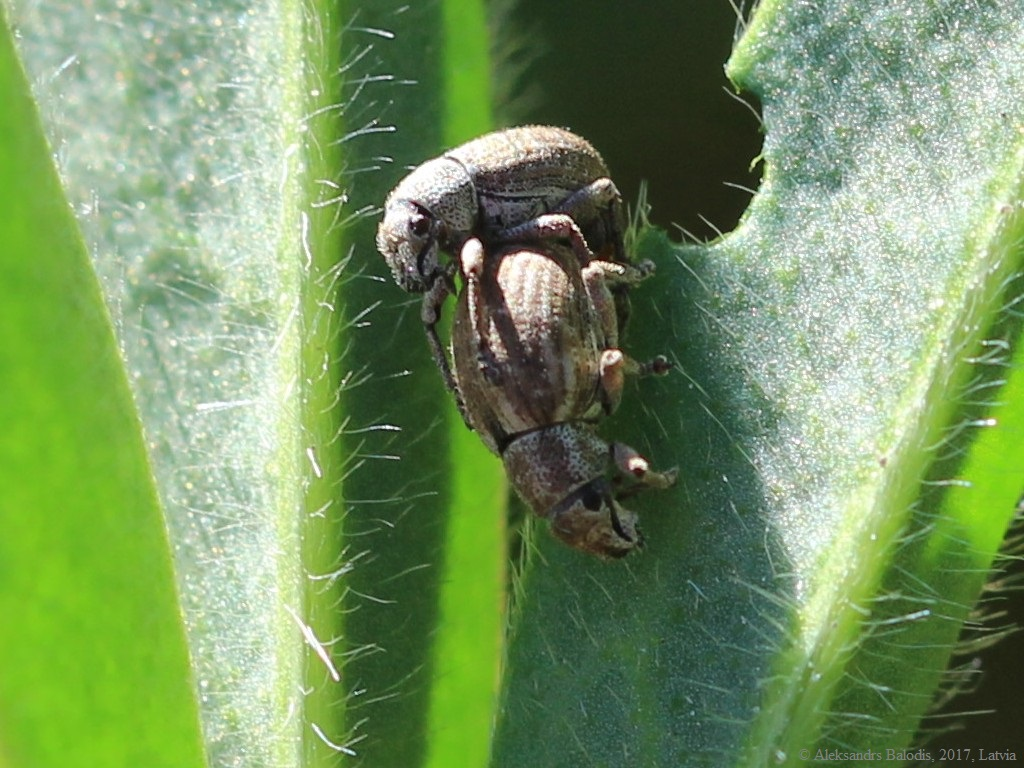
Trachyphloeus bifoveolatus

== Genera ==
These 27 genera belong to the tribe Trachyphloeini:

- Archaeocallirhopalus Legalov, 2013^{c g}
- Atrachyphloeus Voss, 1962
- Cathormiocerus Schénherr, 1842^{c g b}
- Cercopedius Sleeper, 1955^{i c g b}
- Cercopeus Schönherr, 1842^{i c g b}
- Chaetechidius Sleeper, 1955^{i c g b}
- Epistomius Borovec & Skuhrovec, 2017^{c}
- Laohajekia Borovec, 2014^{c g}
- Nama Borovec & Meregalli, 2013^{c g}
- Pelletierellus Borovec, 2009^{c g}
- Pentatrachyphloeus Voss, 1974^{c g}
- Perarogula Hoffmann, 1963^{c g}
- Pseudocercopeus Sleeper, 1955^{i c g b}
- Pseudocneorhinus Roelofs, 1873^{c g b}
- Pseudotrachyphloeosoma Borovec, 2014^{c g}
- Rhinodontodes Voss, 1967^{c g}
- Rhinodontus Faust, 1890^{c g}
- Romualdius Borovec, 2009^{c g}
- Stuebenius Borovec, 2009^{c g}
- Timareta Pascoe, 1872^{c g}
- Tokara Morimoto, 2015
- Trachyodes Marshall, 1916^{c g}
- Trachyphilus Faust, 1887^{c g}
- Trachyphloeomimus Champion, 1911^{c g}
- Trachyphloeosoma Wollaston, 1869^{i c g b}
- Trachyphloeus Germar, 1817^{i c g b}
- Zarazagaia Borovec, 2009^{c g}

Data sources: i = ITIS, c = Catalogue of Life, g = GBIF, b = Bugguide.net
