= Trachyphloeosoma advena =

Scientific classification
- Domain: Eukaryota
- Kingdom: Animalia
- Phylum: Arthropoda
- Class: Insecta
- Order: Coleoptera
- Suborder: Polyphaga
- Infraorder: Cucujiformia
- Family: Curculionidae
- Genus: Trachyphloeosoma
- Species: T. advena

Binomial name
- Trachyphloeosoma advena Zimmermann, 1956

Species of beetle

Trachyphloeosoma advena is a species of broad-nosed weevil in the beetle family Curculionidae.
