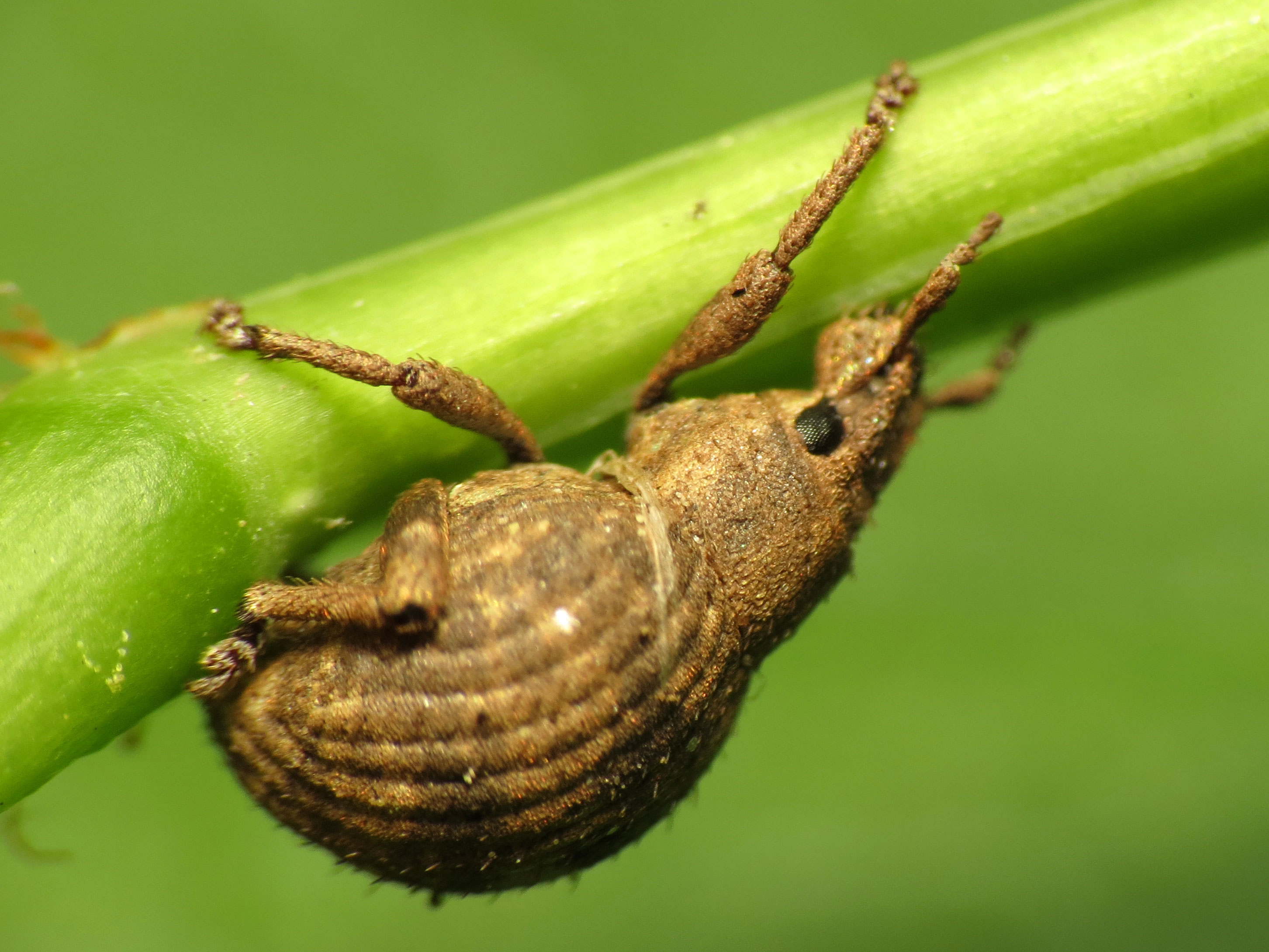
- Pseudocneorhinus bifasciatus

Scientific classification
- Kingdom: Animalia
- Phylum: Arthropoda
- Clade: Pancrustacea
- Class: Insecta
- Order: Coleoptera
- Suborder: Polyphaga
- Infraorder: Cucujiformia
- Family: Curculionidae
- Tribe: Trachyphloeini
- Genus: Pseudocneorhinus; Roelofs, 1873

= Pseudocneorhinus =

Genus of beetles

Pseudocneorhinus is a genus of broad-nosed weevils in the beetle family Curculionidae. There are about 11 described species in Pseudocneorhinus.

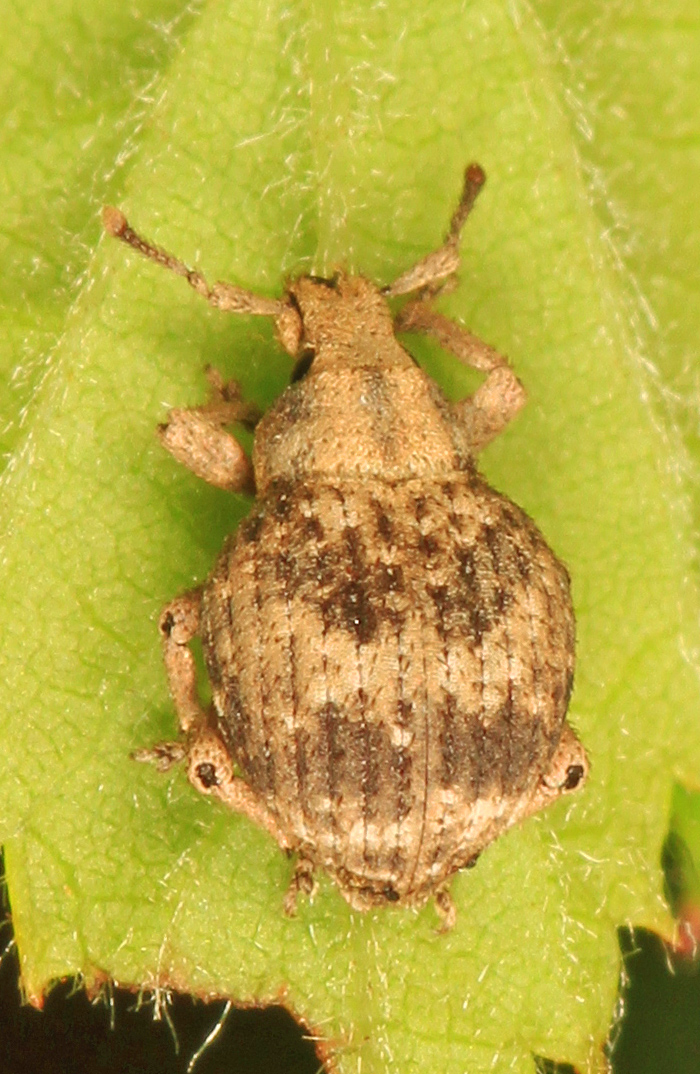
Pseudocneorhinus bifasciatus

== Species ==
These 11 species belong to the genus Pseudocneorhinus:

- Pseudocneorhinus adamsi Roelofs, 1879^{c g}
- Pseudocneorhinus alternans Marshall, 1934^{c g}
- Pseudocneorhinus bifasciatus Roelofs^{c g b} (twobanded Japanese weevil)
- Pseudocneorhinus hirsutus (Formanek, 1916)^{c g}
- Pseudocneorhinus minimus Roelofs, 1879^{c g}
- Pseudocneorhinus obesus Roelofs, 1873^{c g}
- Pseudocneorhinus sellatus Marshall, 1934^{c g}
- Pseudocneorhinus setosus Roelofs, 1879^{c g}
- Pseudocneorhinus soheuksandoensis Han & Yoon, 2000^{c g}
- Pseudocneorhinus squamosus Marshall, 1934^{c g}
- Pseudocneorhinus subcallosus (Voss, 1956)^{c g}

Data sources: i = ITIS, c = Catalogue of Life, g = GBIF, b = Bugguide.net
