= Cercopeus =

Scientific classification
- Domain: Eukaryota
- Kingdom: Animalia
- Phylum: Arthropoda
- Class: Insecta
- Order: Coleoptera
- Suborder: Polyphaga
- Infraorder: Cucujiformia
- Family: Curculionidae
- Tribe: Trachyphloeini
- Genus: Cercopeus; Schönherr, 1842

Genus of weevils

Cercopeus is a genus of broad-nosed weevils in the beetle family Curculionidae. There are about 17 described species in Cercopeus.

== Species ==
These 17 species belong to the genus Cercopeus:

- Cercopeus alexi O?Brien, Ciegler et Giron, 2010^{c g}
- Cercopeus bolli Burke, 1963^{i g}
- Cercopeus chisaius Sleeper, 1955^{i g}
- Cercopeus chrysorrhoeus (Say, 1831)^{i c g b}
- Cercopeus clispus Sleeper, 1955^{i g}
- Cercopeus confusor Sleeper, 1955^{i g}
- Cercopeus cornelli O?Brien, Ciegler et Giron, 2010^{c g}
- Cercopeus femoratus O?Brien, Ciegler and Giron, 2010^{c g}
- Cercopeus isquitus Sleeper, 1955^{i g}
- Cercopeus komareki O'Brien, 1977^{i c g b}
- Cercopeus maspavancus Sleeper, 1955^{i c g}
- Cercopeus paulus O?Brien, Ciegler et Giron, 2010^{c g}
- Cercopeus schwarzi Sleeper, 1955^{i g}
- Cercopeus simius Sleeper, 1955^{i g}
- Cercopeus skelleyi O^{c g b}
- Cercopeus strigicollis Sleeper, 1955^{i c g}
- Cercopeus tibialis O?Brien, Ciegler et Giron, 2010^{c g}

Data sources: i = ITIS, c = Catalogue of Life, g = GBIF, b = Bugguide.net
