= Trachyphloeosoma =

Scientific classification
- Domain: Eukaryota
- Kingdom: Animalia
- Phylum: Arthropoda
- Class: Insecta
- Order: Coleoptera
- Suborder: Polyphaga
- Infraorder: Cucujiformia
- Family: Curculionidae
- Tribe: Trachyphloeini
- Genus: Trachyphloeosoma; Wollaston, 1869

Genus of beetles

Trachyphloeosoma is a genus of broad-nosed weevils in the beetle family Curculionidae. There are about five described species in Trachyphloeosoma.

== Species ==
These five species belong to the genus Trachyphloeosoma:

- Trachyphloeosoma advena Zimmermann, 1956^{i c g b}
- Trachyphloeosoma brevicolle Voss, 1974^{c g}
- Trachyphloeosoma buruana (Heller, 1929)^{c g}
- Trachyphloeosoma nudum Borovec, 2014^{c g}
- Trachyphloeosoma setosum Wollaston, 1869^{c g}

Data sources: i = ITIS, c = Catalogue of Life, g = GBIF, b = Bugguide.net
