= Cercopeus chrysorrhoeus =

Scientific classification
- Domain: Eukaryota
- Kingdom: Animalia
- Phylum: Arthropoda
- Class: Insecta
- Order: Coleoptera
- Suborder: Polyphaga
- Infraorder: Cucujiformia
- Family: Curculionidae
- Genus: Cercopeus
- Species: C. chrysorrhoeus

Binomial name
- Cercopeus chrysorrhoeus (Say, 1831)

Species of beetle

Cercopeus chrysorrhoeus is a species of the broad-nosed weevil in the beetle family of Curculionidae. It is found in North America.
