= Pseudocercopeus =

Scientific classification
- Domain: Eukaryota
- Kingdom: Animalia
- Phylum: Arthropoda
- Class: Insecta
- Order: Coleoptera
- Suborder: Polyphaga
- Infraorder: Cucujiformia
- Family: Curculionidae
- Tribe: Trachyphloeini
- Genus: Pseudocercopeus; Sleeper, 1955

Genus of beetles

Pseudocercopeus is a genus of broad-nosed weevils in the beetle family Curculionidae. There is at least one described species in Pseudocercopeus, P. setosus.
