= Cercopeus komareki =

Scientific classification
- Domain: Eukaryota
- Kingdom: Animalia
- Phylum: Arthropoda
- Class: Insecta
- Order: Coleoptera
- Suborder: Polyphaga
- Infraorder: Cucujiformia
- Family: Curculionidae
- Genus: Cercopeus
- Species: C. komareki

Binomial name
- Cercopeus komareki O'Brien, 1977

Species of beetle

Cercopeus komareki is a species of broad-nosed weevil in the beetle family Curculionidae. It is found in North America.
