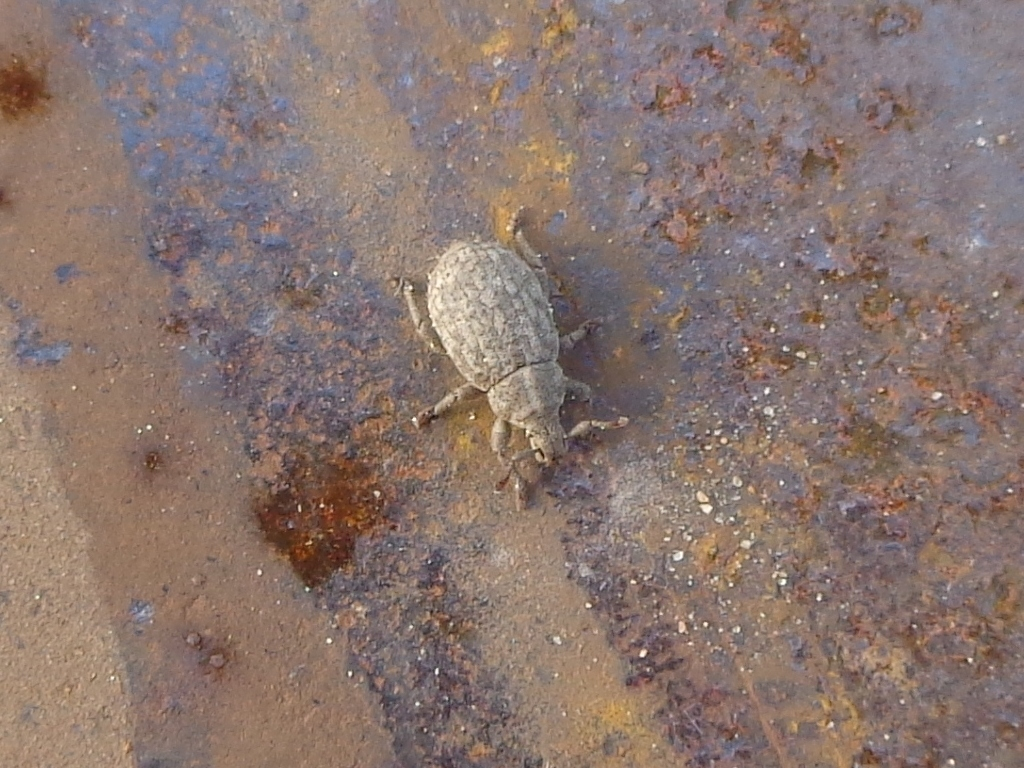

Scientific classification
- Kingdom: Animalia
- Phylum: Arthropoda
- Class: Insecta
- Order: Coleoptera
- Suborder: Polyphaga
- Infraorder: Cucujiformia
- Family: Curculionidae
- Genus: Romualdius
- Species: R. scaber

Binomial name
- Romualdius scaber (Linnaeus, 1758)

Synonyms
- Trachyphloeus davisi Blatchley, 1916; Trachyphloeus bifoveolatus (Beck, 1817)

= Romualdius scaber =

Species of beetle

Romualdius scaber, known generally as the crusted root weevil or crusted grass weevil, is a species of broad-nosed weevil in the beetle family Curculionidae. It is found in Europe and North America.

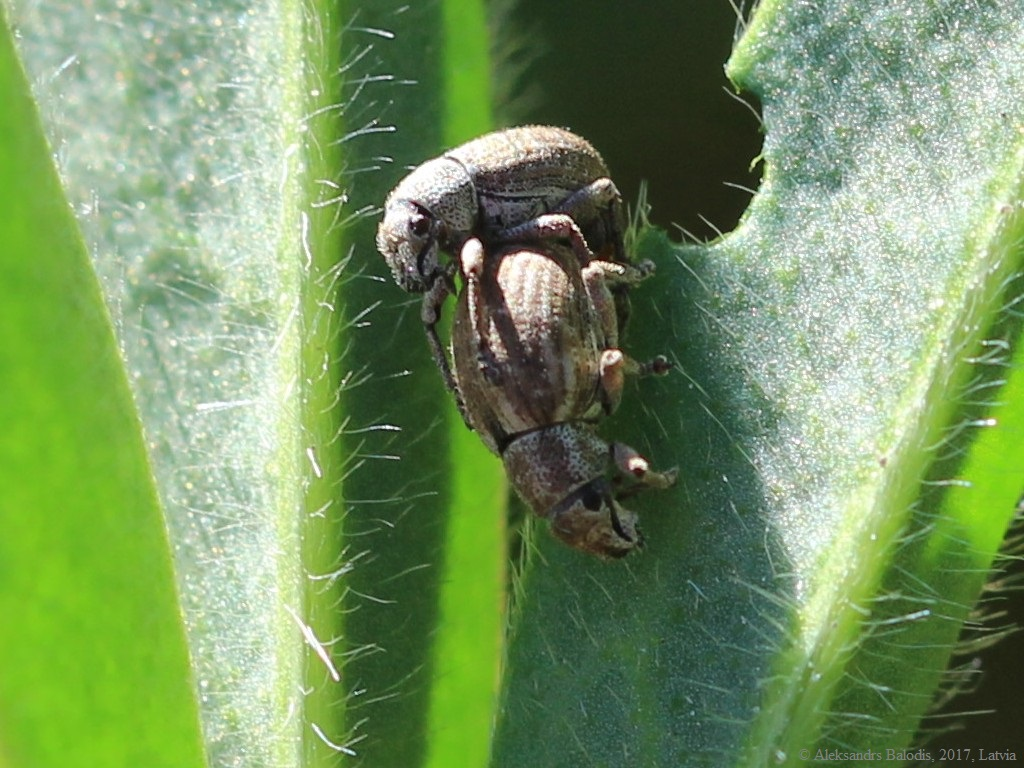
Crusted root weevil, Romualdius scaber

== Nomenclature ==
The species was first described, as Curculio scaber, by Carl Linnaeus in 1758. Linnaeus' description was sketchy, and for a long time was thought to refer to the species now known as Otiorhynchus carinatopunctatus, with the present species referred to bifoveolatus Beck. This misunderstanding was corrected by Löbl & Smetana (2013).

While it was known as bifoveolatus, the species was designated by Roman Borovec (2009) as the type of his new genus Romualdius.
