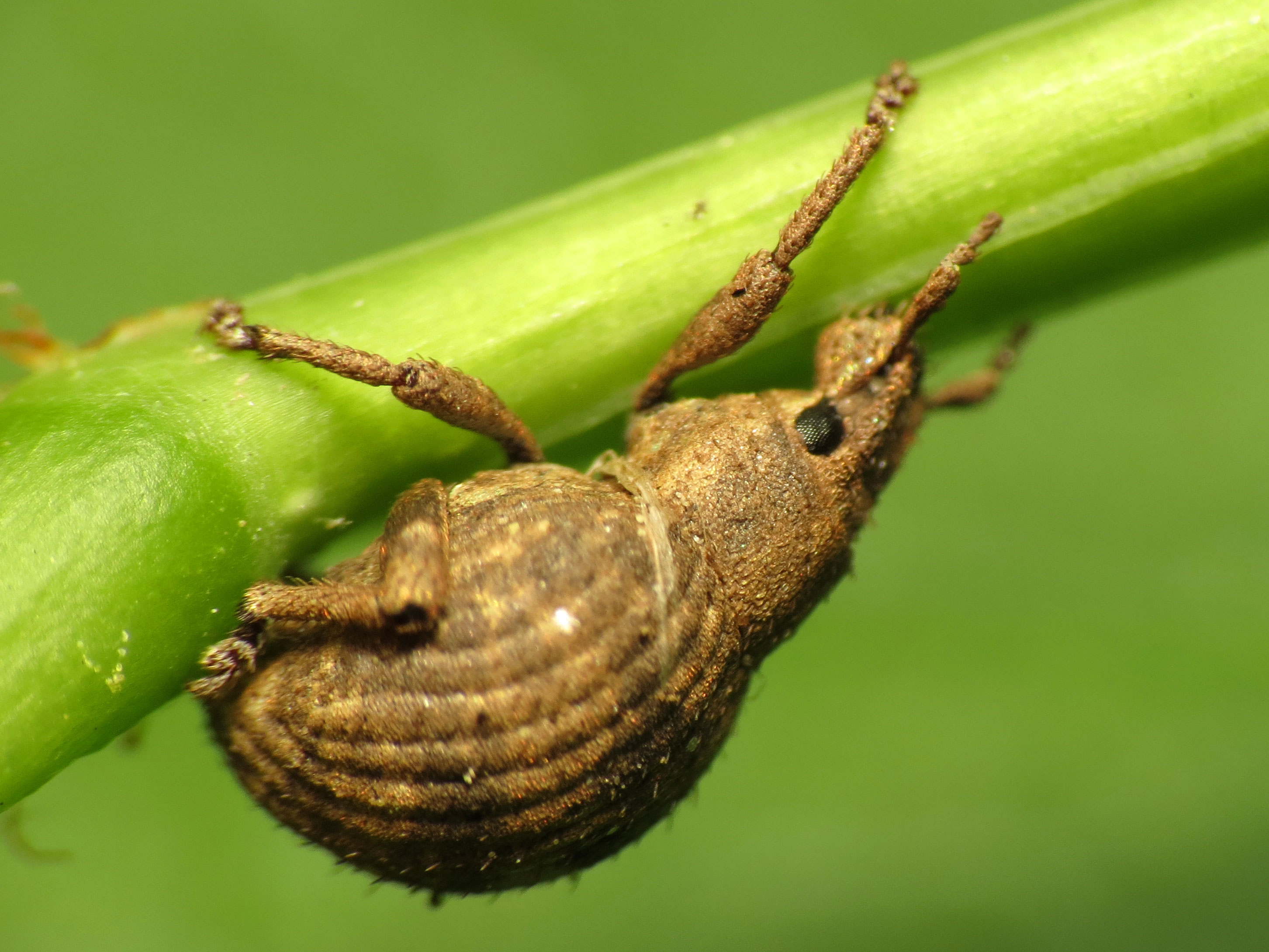

Scientific classification
- Domain: Eukaryota
- Kingdom: Animalia
- Phylum: Arthropoda
- Class: Insecta
- Order: Coleoptera
- Suborder: Polyphaga
- Infraorder: Cucujiformia
- Family: Curculionidae
- Genus: Pseudocneorhinus
- Species: P. bifasciatus

Binomial name
- Pseudocneorhinus bifasciatus Roelofs

= Pseudocneorhinus bifasciatus =

Species of beetle

Pseudocneorhinus bifasciatus, the twobanded Japanese weevil, is a species of broad-nosed weevil in the beetle family Curculionidae.

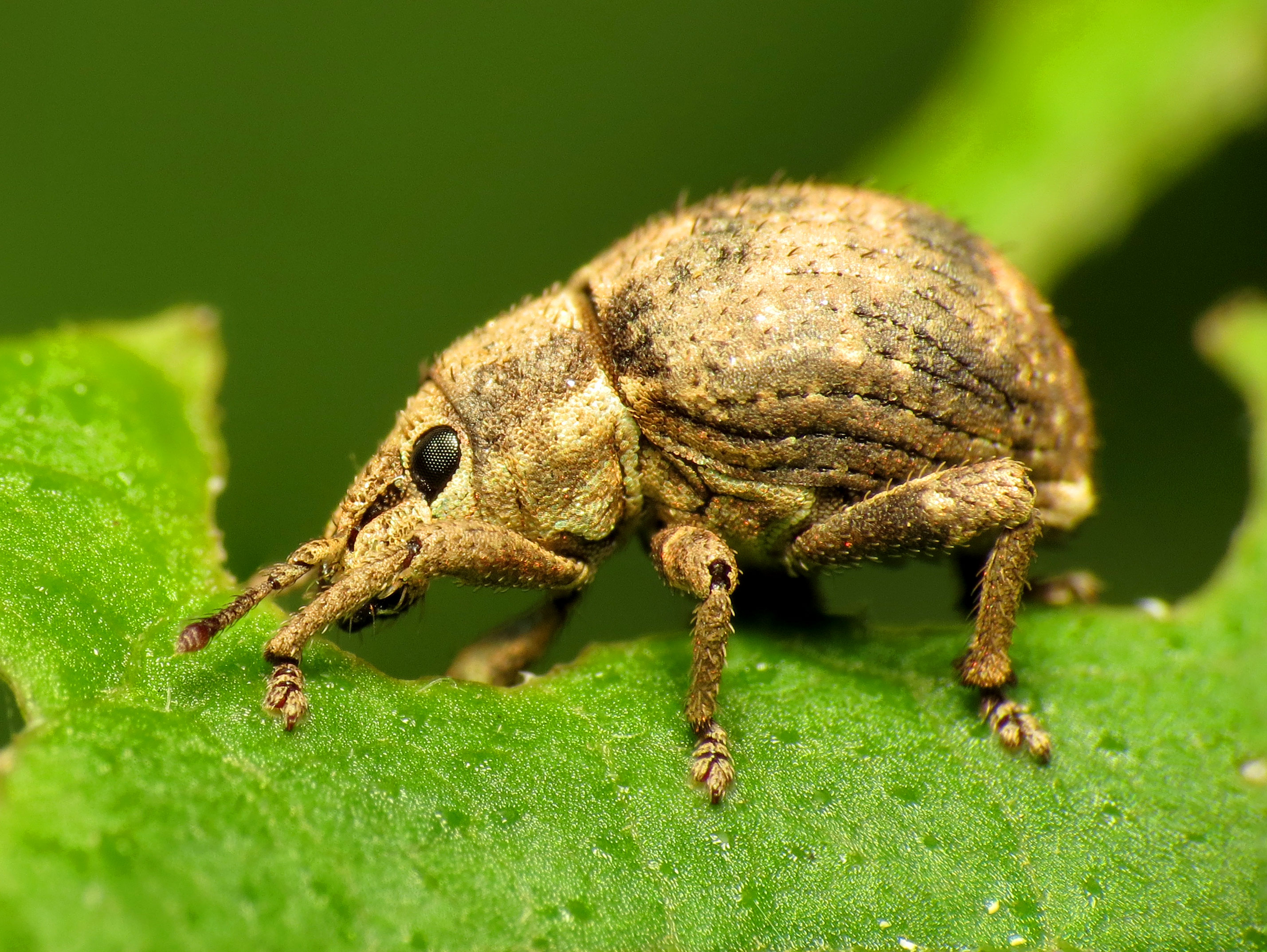
Twobanded Japanese weevil, Pseudocneorhinus bifasciatus

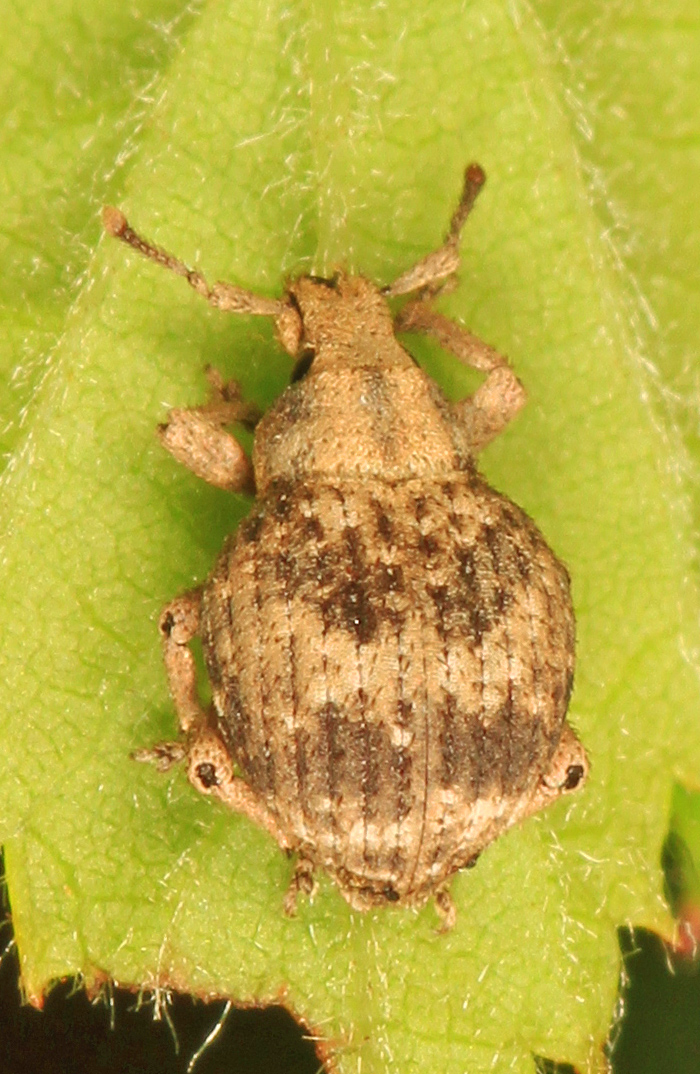
Twobanded Japanese weevil, Pseudocneorhinus bifasciatus
