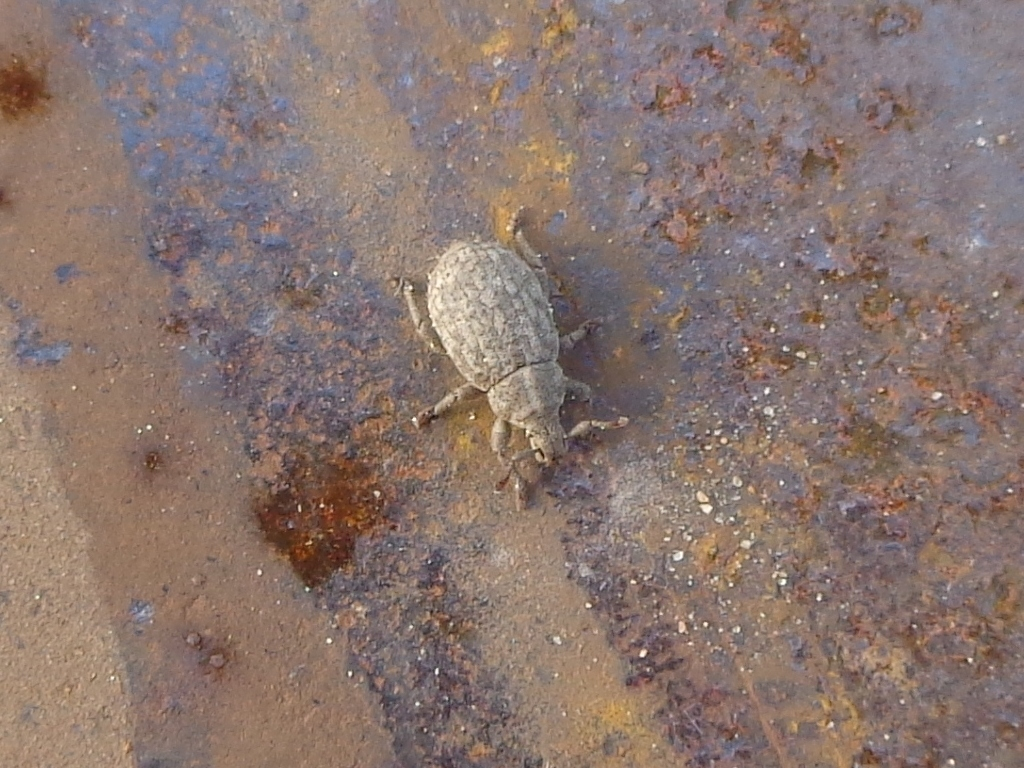
- Romualdius scaber

Scientific classification
- Domain: Eukaryota
- Kingdom: Animalia
- Phylum: Arthropoda
- Class: Insecta
- Order: Coleoptera
- Suborder: Polyphaga
- Infraorder: Cucujiformia
- Family: Curculionidae
- Genus: Romualdius; Borovec, 2009

= Romualdius =

Genus of beetles

Romualdius is a genus of snout and bark beetles in the family Curculionidae. There are a dozen described species in Romualdius. The genus was raised by Roman Borovec in 2009 for a group of species formerly assigned to Trachyphloeus, and is named after the eminent Czech entomologist Romuald Formánek (1857-1927).

== Species ==
- Romualdius algerinus (Seidlitz, 1868)
- Romualdius angustisetulus (Hansen, 1915)
- Romualdius ascendens (Peyerimhoff, 1918)
- Romualdius beauprei (Pic, 1905)
- Romualdius canaliculatus (Schaufuss, 1867)
- Romualdius fremuthi (Borovec & Osella, 1996)
- Romualdius leprosus (Hoffmann, 1938)
- Romualdius longirostris (Formanek, 1910)
- Romualdius pardoi (Hoffmann, 1952)
- Romualdius peyerimhoffi (Formanek, 1910)
- Romualdius rhinodontoides (Hoffmann, 1952)
- Romualdius scaber (Linnaeus, 1758)
