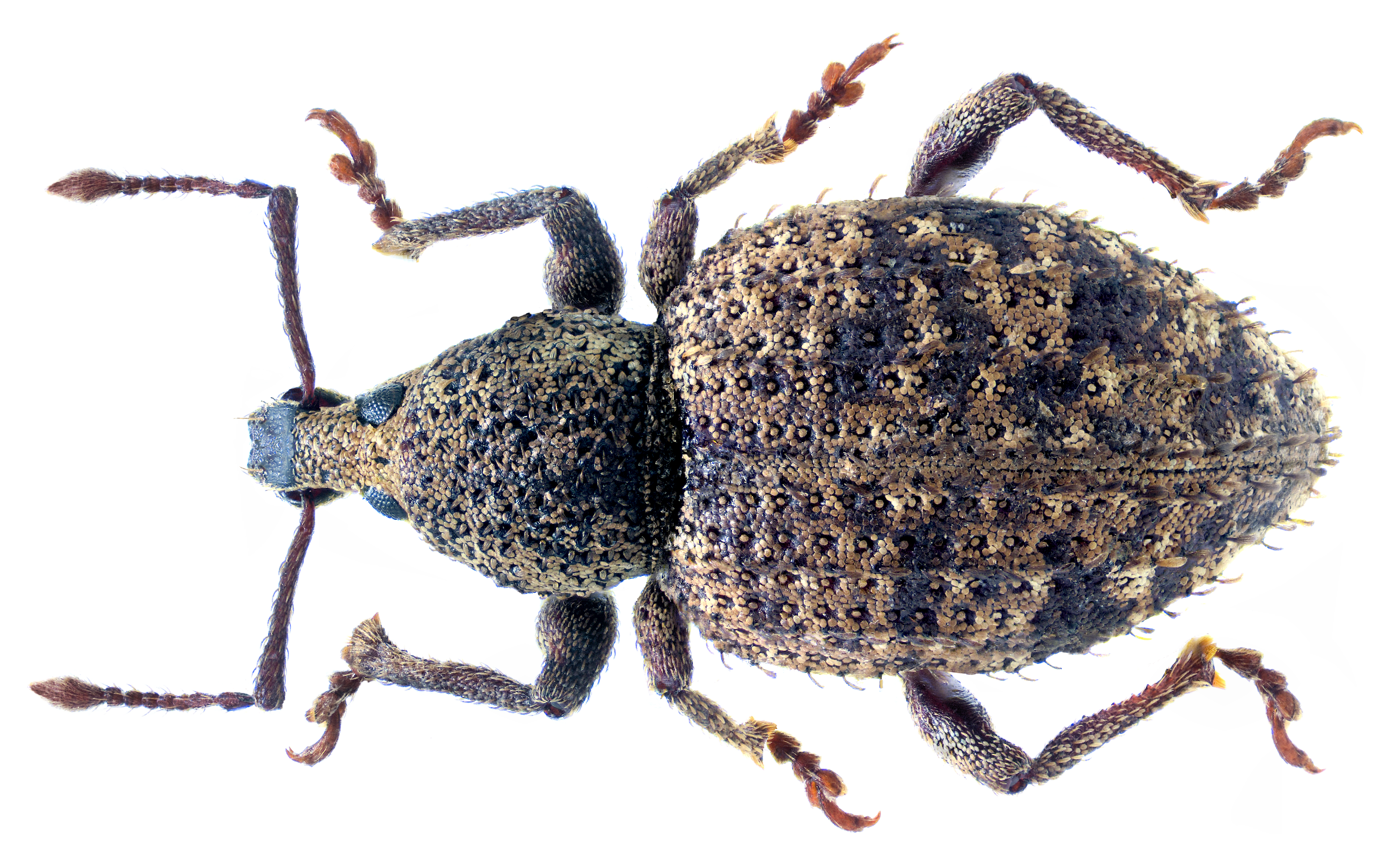

Scientific classification
- Kingdom: Animalia
- Phylum: Arthropoda
- Clade: Pancrustacea
- Class: Insecta
- Order: Coleoptera
- Suborder: Polyphaga
- Infraorder: Cucujiformia
- Superfamily: Curculionoidea
- Family: Curculionidae
- Genus: Otiorhynchus
- Species: O. carinatopunctatus

Binomial name
- Otiorhynchus carinatopunctatus (Retzius, 1783)

= Otiorhynchus carinatopunctatus =

Species of beetle

Otiorhynchus carinatopunctatus is a species of broad-nosed weevil in the beetle family Curculionidae. It is native to Europe and introduced in North America.

== Nomenclature ==
This species was wrongly identified with Curculio scaber Linnaeus, 1758 from 1898 on. When reinspected, types proved not identical with this species at all, but to the species then known as Trachyphloeus bifoveolatus.
