= Cuiciuna =

Scientific classification
- Domain: Eukaryota
- Kingdom: Animalia
- Phylum: Arthropoda
- Class: Insecta
- Order: Coleoptera
- Suborder: Polyphaga
- Infraorder: Cucujiformia
- Family: Cerambycidae
- Tribe: Hemophilini
- Genus: Pyrobolus; Chevrolat, 1838

Synonyms
- Cuiciuna Martins & Galileo, 1997

Genus of beetles

Pyrobolus is a genus of longhorn beetles of the subfamily Lamiinae, containing the following species:

- Pyrobolus amoenoides (Fisher, 1938)
- Pyrobolus fumigatus (Germar, 1824)
- Pyrobolus iuati (Galileo & Martins, 1997)
- Pyrobolus melancholicus (Melzer, 1931)
- Pyrobolus rectilineus (Bates, 1881)
