= Rachidion gagatinum =

Scientific classification
- Domain: Eukaryota
- Kingdom: Animalia
- Phylum: Arthropoda
- Class: Insecta
- Order: Coleoptera
- Suborder: Polyphaga
- Infraorder: Cucujiformia
- Family: Cerambycidae
- Genus: Rachidion
- Species: R. gagatinum

Binomial name
- Rachidion gagatinum (Germar, 1824)

Species of beetle

Rachidion gagatinum is a species of beetle in the family Cerambycidae. It was described by Ernst Friedrich Germar in 1824.
