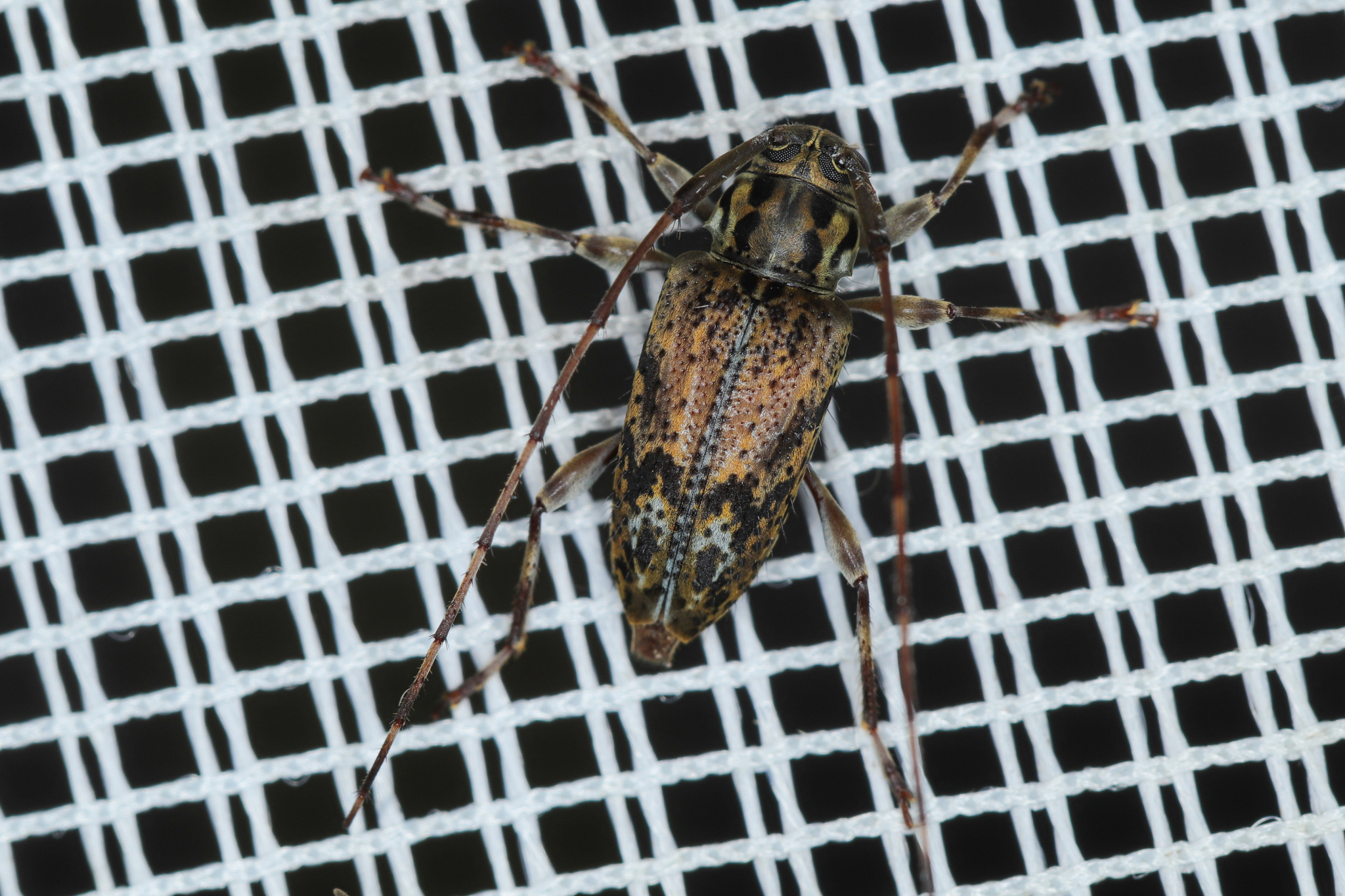

Scientific classification
- Kingdom: Animalia
- Phylum: Arthropoda
- Class: Insecta
- Order: Coleoptera
- Suborder: Polyphaga
- Infraorder: Cucujiformia
- Family: Cerambycidae
- Genus: Neoeutrypanus
- Species: N. mutilatus

Binomial name
- Neoeutrypanus mutilatus (Germar, 1824)

= Neoeutrypanus mutilatus =

Species of beetle

Neoeutrypanus mutilatus is a species of beetle in the family Cerambycidae. It was described by Ernst Friedrich Germar in 1824.
