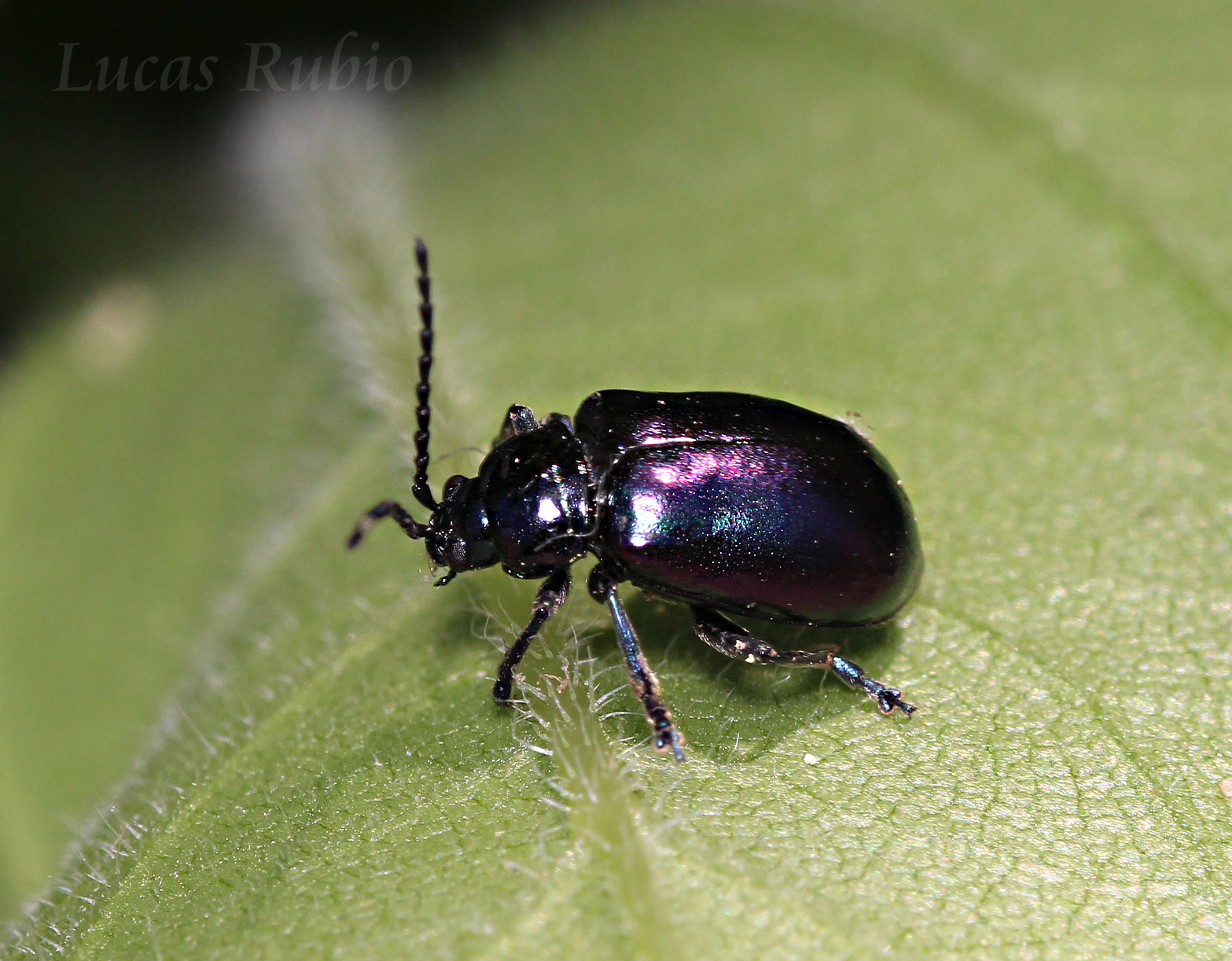
- Macrohaltica transversa, Argentina

Scientific classification
- Kingdom: Animalia
- Phylum: Arthropoda
- Class: Insecta
- Order: Coleoptera
- Suborder: Polyphaga
- Infraorder: Cucujiformia
- Family: Chrysomelidae
- Genus: Macrohaltica
- Species: M. transversa

Binomial name
- Macrohaltica transversa (Germar, 1824)

Synonyms
- Altica transversa Germar, 1824

= Macrohaltica transversa =

Species of flea beetle

Macrohaltica transversa is a species of flea beetle in the family Chrysomelidae. It is found in South America (southern Brazil, northern Argentina, Uruguay, Paraguay, and southern Bolivia).

The body measures 6.25 mm–6.37 mm × 3.25 mm–3.62 mm (0.246 in–0.251 in × 0.128 in–0.143 in).
