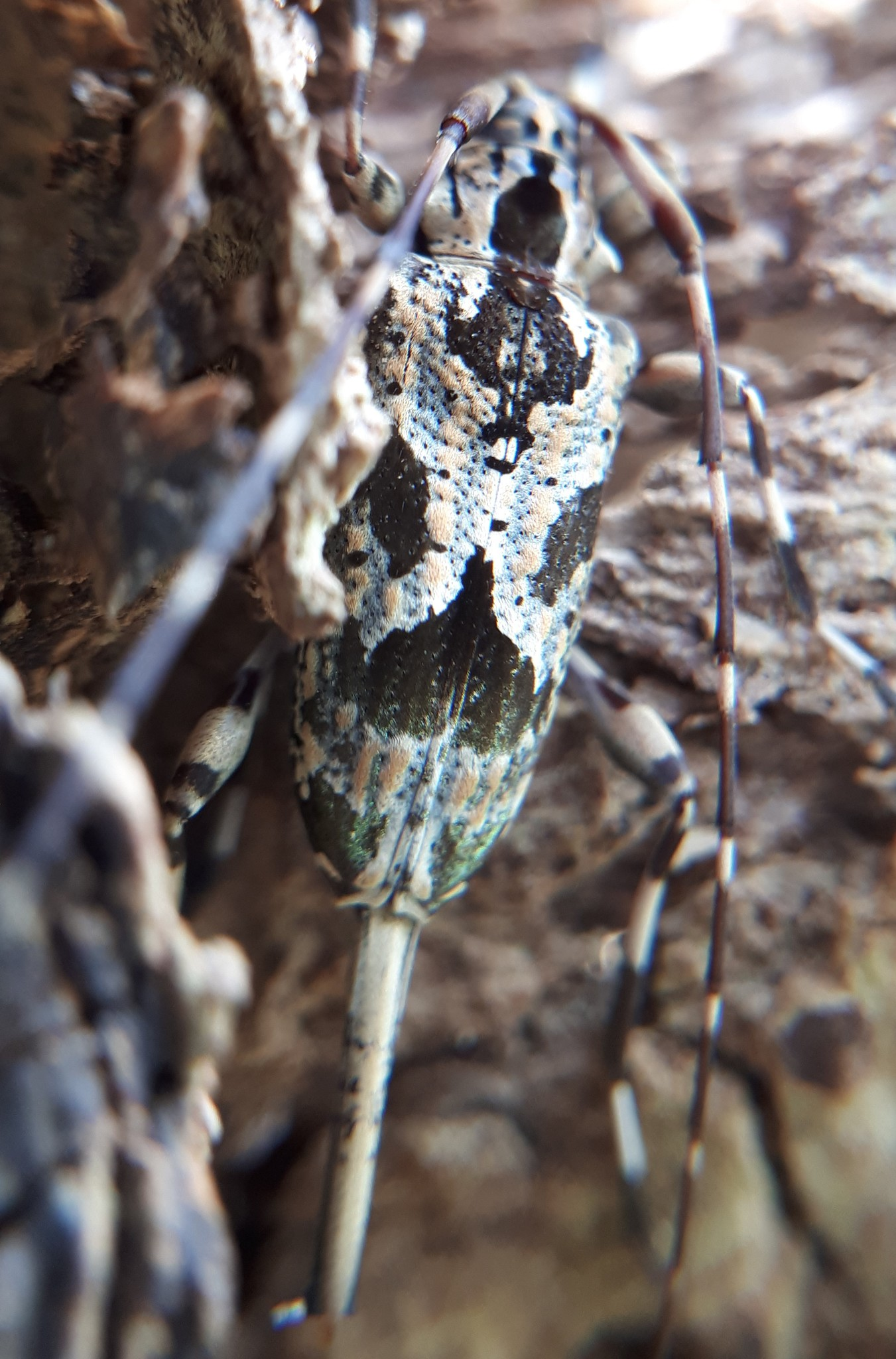

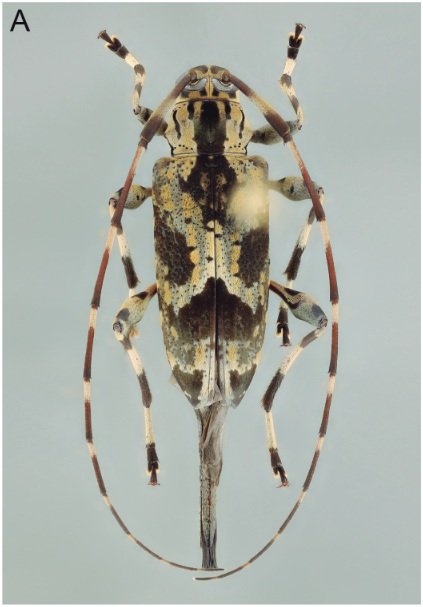

Scientific classification
- Kingdom: Animalia
- Phylum: Arthropoda
- Clade: Pancrustacea
- Class: Insecta
- Order: Coleoptera
- Suborder: Polyphaga
- Infraorder: Cucujiformia
- Family: Cerambycidae
- Genus: Eutrypanus
- Species: E. dorsalis

Binomial name
- Eutrypanus dorsalis (Germar, 1824)

Synonyms
- Lamia dorsalis Germar, 1823; Aedilis signata Audinet-Serville, 1835; Leiopus histrionicus Gistel, 1848

= Eutrypanus dorsalis =

Species of beetle

Eutrypanus dorsalis is a species of longhorn beetle of the subfamily Lamiinae. It was described by Ernst Friedrich Germar in 1824 and is known from eastern Brazil, Paraguay, Argentina, and Bolivia.
