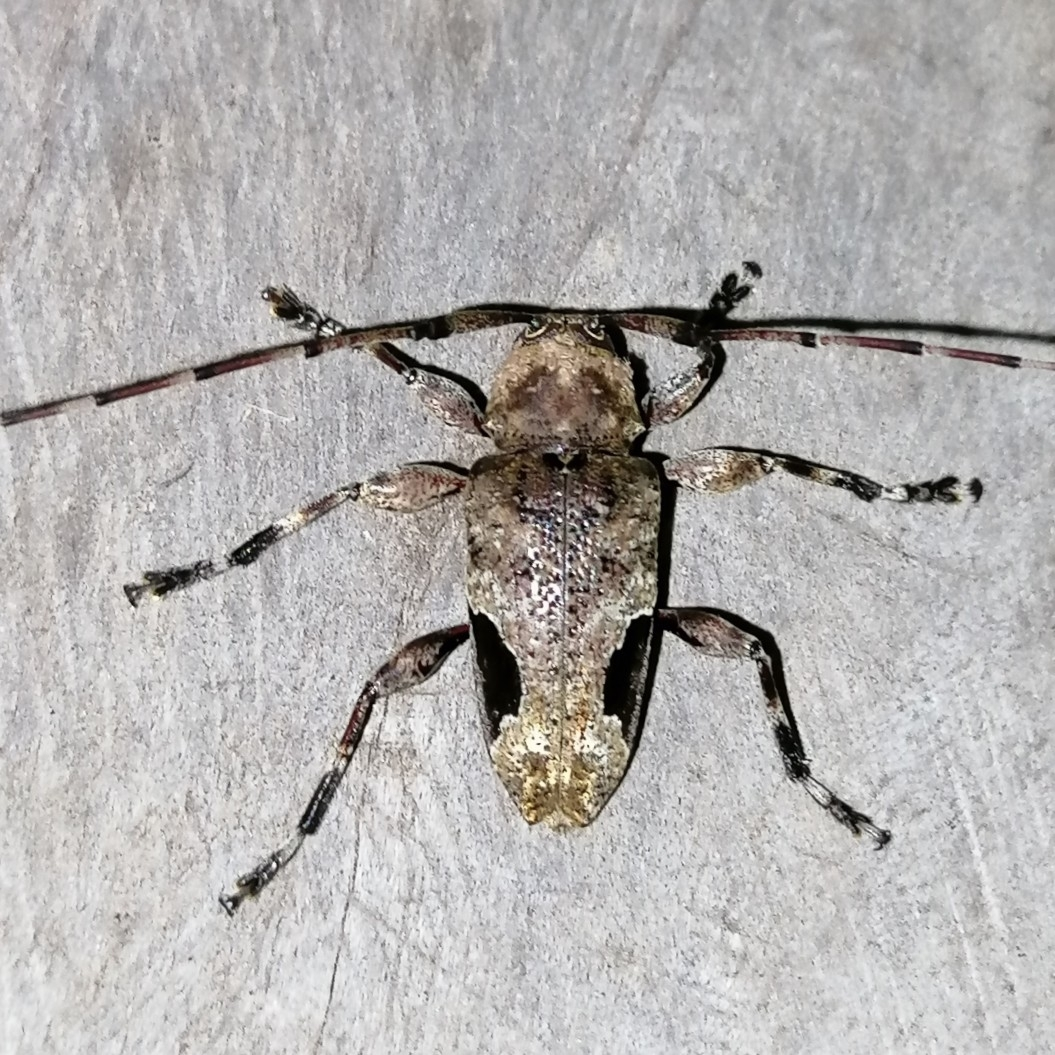

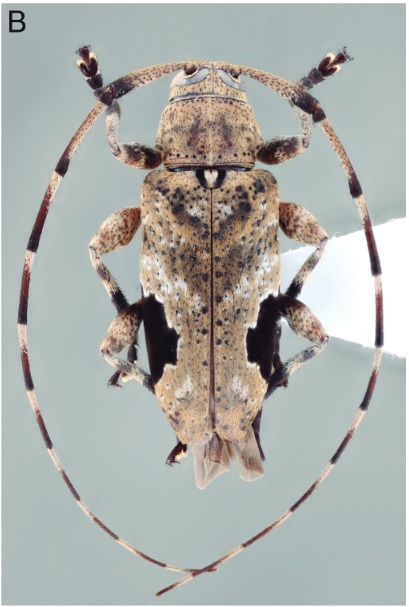

Scientific classification
- Kingdom: Animalia
- Phylum: Arthropoda
- Clade: Pancrustacea
- Class: Insecta
- Order: Coleoptera
- Suborder: Polyphaga
- Infraorder: Cucujiformia
- Family: Cerambycidae
- Genus: Hylettus
- Species: H. seniculus

Binomial name
- Hylettus seniculus (Germar, 1824)

Synonyms
- Lamia seniculus Germar, 1823; Nyssodrys ophthalmica Lameere, 1884

= Hylettus seniculus =

Species of beetle

Hylettus seniculus is a species of longhorn beetle of the subfamily Lamiinae. It was described by Ernst Friedrich Germar in 1824 and is widely distributed throughout South America including Bolivia. It is also known from Costa Rica.
