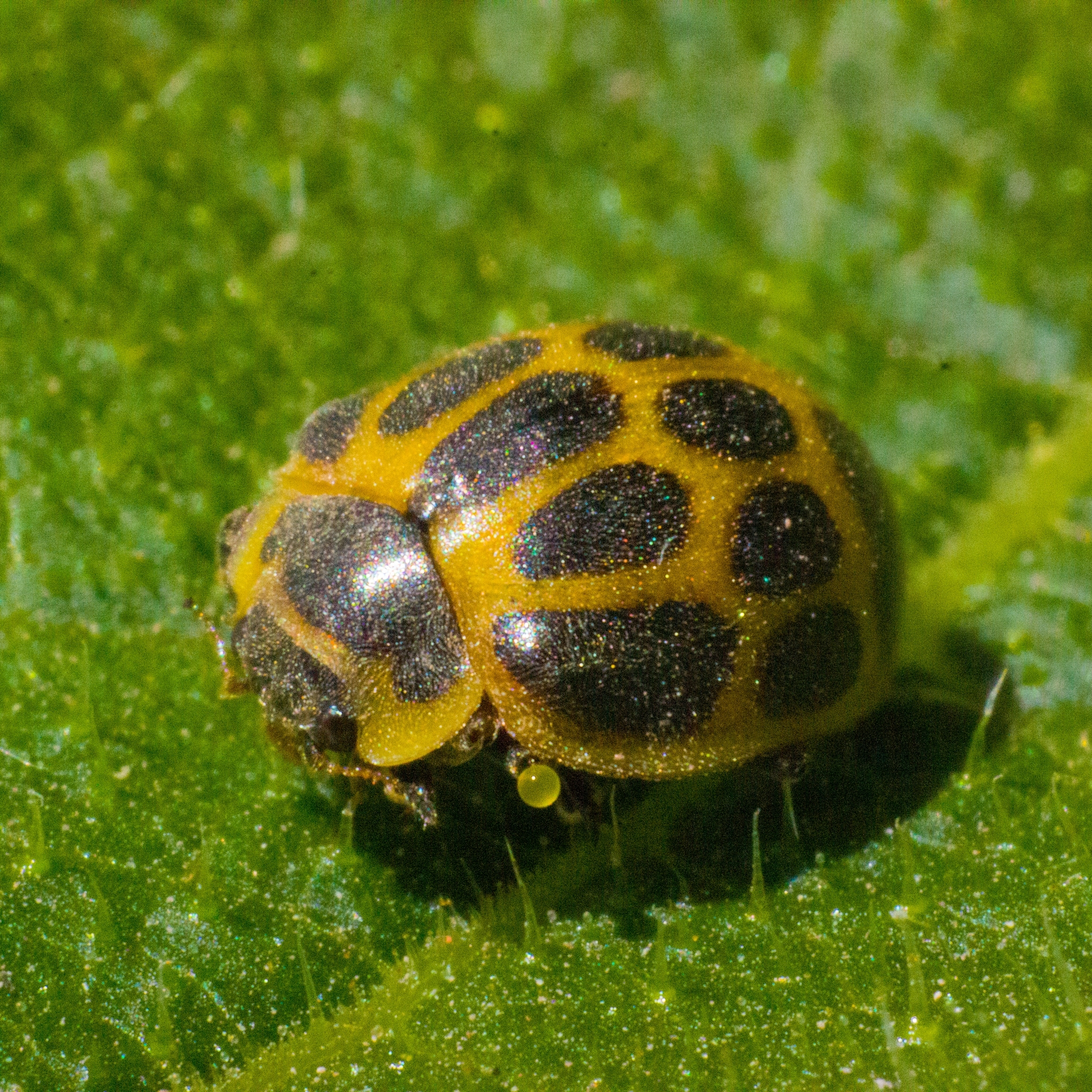

Scientific classification
- Kingdom: Animalia
- Phylum: Arthropoda
- Clade: Pancrustacea
- Class: Insecta
- Order: Coleoptera
- Suborder: Polyphaga
- Infraorder: Cucujiformia
- Family: Coccinellidae
- Genus: Epilachna
- Species: E. paenulata

Binomial name
- Epilachna paenulata (Germar, 1824)

Synonyms
- Coccinella paenulata Germar, 1824

= Epilachna paenulata =

Species of beetle

Epilachna paenulata is a species of beetle of the family Coccinellidae. It is found in Argentina, Bolivia, Brazil, Colombia, Ecuador and Paraguay.

== Description ==
Adults reach a length of about 6.75–8.78 mm. Adults are black. The lateral margin and anterior angle of the pronotum are yellow and the elytron is yellow with eight black spots.
