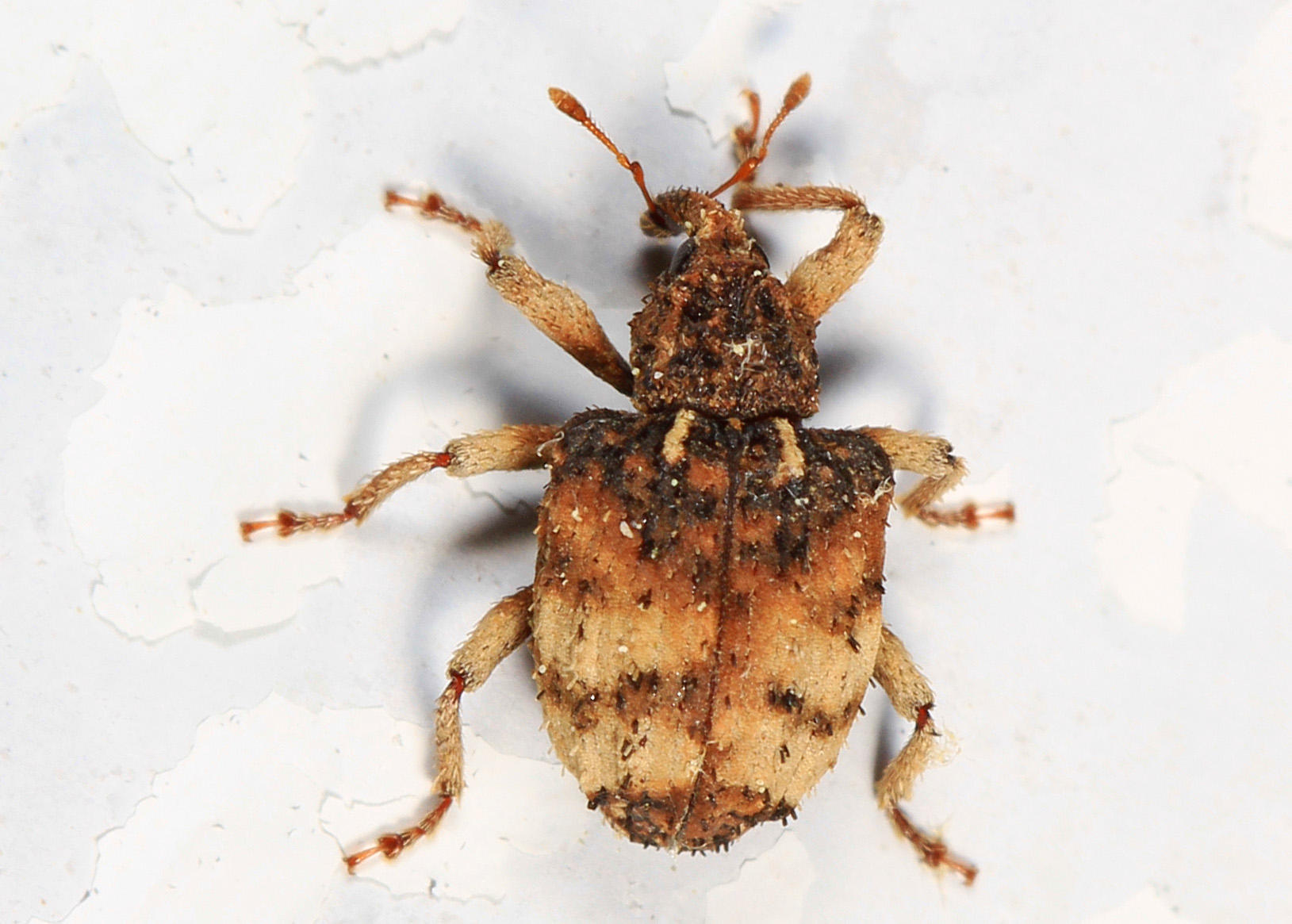

Scientific classification
- Domain: Eukaryota
- Kingdom: Animalia
- Phylum: Arthropoda
- Class: Insecta
- Order: Coleoptera
- Suborder: Polyphaga
- Infraorder: Cucujiformia
- Family: Curculionidae
- Genus: Phyrdenus
- Species: P. divergens

Binomial name
- Phyrdenus divergens (Germar, 1824)

Synonyms
- Phyrdenus undatus LeConte, 1876

= Phyrdenus divergens =

Species of beetle

Phyrdenus divergens is a species of hidden snout weevil in the beetle family Curculionidae. It is found in North America.
