= Sphallotrichus setosus =

Scientific classification
- Kingdom: Animalia
- Phylum: Arthropoda
- Class: Insecta
- Order: Coleoptera
- Suborder: Polyphaga
- Infraorder: Cucujiformia
- Family: Cerambycidae
- Subfamily: Cerambycinae
- Tribe: Cerambycini
- Genus: Sphallotrichus
- Species: S. setosus

Binomial name
- Sphallotrichus setosus (Germar, 1823)

Synonyms
- Cerambyx setosus Germar, 1824; Criodion setosum White, 1853; Criodion steosus Germar, 1839; Sphallenum setosum Zajciw, 1972; Sphallenum setosus Viana, 1972; Sphallotrichus setosum Fragoso, 1982

Species of beetle

Sphallotrichus setosus is a species in the longhorn beetle family Cerambycidae. It is found in Argentina, Brazil, and Paraguay, which suggests a preference for tropical and subtropical environments within these nations.

This species was first described by Ernst Friedrich Germar in 1824. Just like other members of its family, this beetle is known for its strikingly long antennae and sturdy body.

Ecologically, S. setosus is known to feed on a variety of trees, including guava (Psidium guajava), Cajanus indicus, and species of Annona, making it an important wood-borer in its native habitats.
