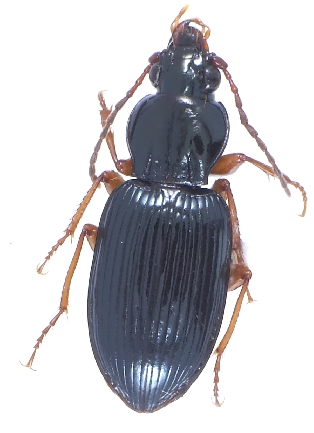

Scientific classification
- Domain: Eukaryota
- Kingdom: Animalia
- Phylum: Arthropoda
- Class: Insecta
- Order: Coleoptera
- Suborder: Adephaga
- Family: Carabidae
- Genus: Abacetus
- Species: A. salzmanni

Binomial name
- Abacetus salzmanni (Germar, 1824)

= Abacetus salzmanni =

Species of beetle

Abacetus salzmanni is a species of ground beetle in the subfamily Pterostichinae. It was described by Ernst Friedrich Germar in 1824.
