= Rhinotragus dorsiger =

Scientific classification
- Kingdom: Animalia
- Phylum: Arthropoda
- Class: Insecta
- Order: Coleoptera
- Suborder: Polyphaga
- Infraorder: Cucujiformia
- Family: Cerambycidae
- Genus: Rhinotragus
- Species: R. dorsiger

Binomial name
- Rhinotragus dorsiger Germar, 1824

Species of beetle

Rhinotragus dorsiger is a species of beetle in the family Cerambycidae. It was described by Ernst Friedrich Germar in 1824.
