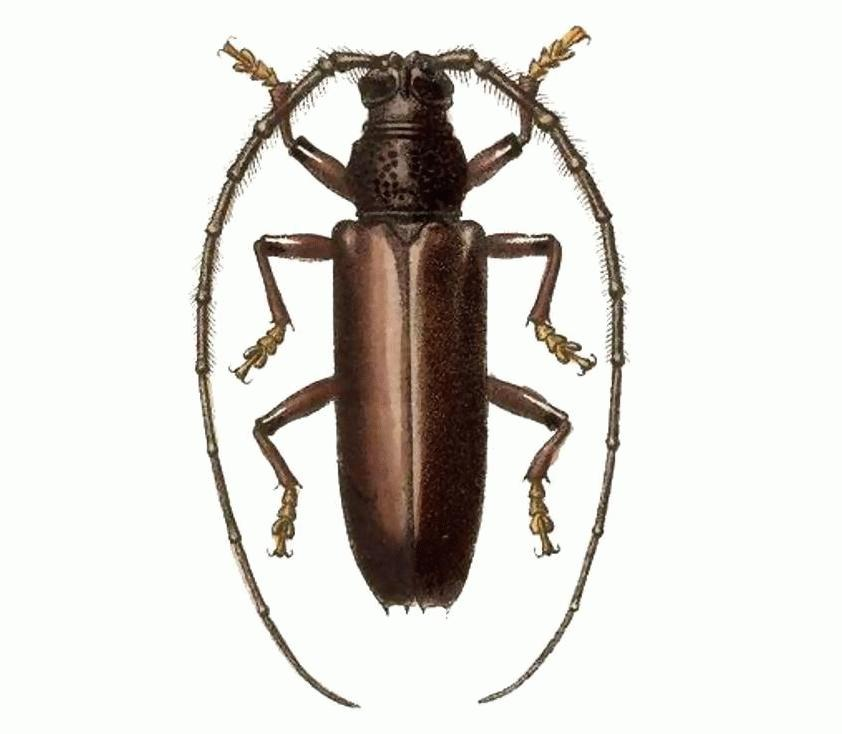

Scientific classification
- Domain: Eukaryota
- Kingdom: Animalia
- Phylum: Arthropoda
- Class: Insecta
- Order: Coleoptera
- Suborder: Polyphaga
- Infraorder: Cucujiformia
- Family: Cerambycidae
- Subfamily: Cerambycinae
- Tribe: Cerambycini
- Genus: Sphallotrichus; Fragoso, 1982

= Sphallotrichus =

Genus of beetles

Sphallotrichus is a genus of beetles in the family Cerambycidae, containing the following species:

Species	Authorship	Range	Subspecies	Synonyms
Sphallotrichus bidens	(Fabricius, 1801)	The Guianas, Venezuela, northwestern Brazil, Bolivia		Cerambyx bidens Fabricius, 1801; Cerambyx lugubris Voet, 1806 (Unav.); Cridion castanopterum Erichson, 1849; Sphallenum femorale Bates, 1870
Sphallotrichus hirsuticornis	Fragoso, 1995	eastern Ecuador		Sphallotrichus puncticollis hirsuticornis Fragoso, 1995
Sphallotrichus puncticollis	(Bates, 1870)	Bolivia, north-central Brazil, French Guiana	Sphallotrichus puncticolle puncticolle; Sphallotrichus puncticolle robustus	Sphallenum puncticolle Bates, 1870
Sphallotrichus sculpticollis	(Buquet, 1852)	Colombia		Criodion sculpticolle Buquet, 1852
Sphallotrichus sericeotomentosus	Fragoso, 1995	Venezuela, Brazil, Bolivia		
Sphallotrichus setosus	(Germar, 1824)	southeastern Brazil, Paraguay, Argentina		
Sphallotrichus spadiceus	(Gahan, 1892)	eastern and southeastern Brazil, Argentina		
