= Harpalus sulphuripes =

Scientific classification
- Kingdom: Animalia
- Phylum: Arthropoda
- Class: Insecta
- Order: Coleoptera
- Suborder: Adephaga
- Family: Carabidae
- Genus: Harpalus
- Species: H. sulphuripes

Binomial name
- Harpalus sulphuripes Germar, 1824

Species of beetle

Harpalus sulphuripes is a species of ground beetle in the subfamily Harpalinae. It was described by Ernst Friedrich Germar in 1824.
