= Apagomera triangularis =

Scientific classification
- Domain: Eukaryota
- Kingdom: Animalia
- Phylum: Arthropoda
- Class: Insecta
- Order: Coleoptera
- Suborder: Polyphaga
- Infraorder: Cucujiformia
- Family: Cerambycidae
- Genus: Apagomera
- Species: A. triangularis

Binomial name
- Apagomera triangularis (Germar, 1824)

Synonyms
- Amphionycha triangularis Dejean, 1835; Erana triangularis Lacordaire, 1872; Hemilophus triangularis Castelnau, 1840; Saperda triangularis Germar, 1824

Species of beetle

Apagomera triangularis is a species of beetle in the family Cerambycidae. It was described by Ernst Friedrich Germar in 1824. It is known from Brazil.
