= Dorcadion divisum =

Scientific classification
- Kingdom: Animalia
- Phylum: Arthropoda
- Clade: Pancrustacea
- Class: Insecta
- Order: Coleoptera
- Suborder: Polyphaga
- Infraorder: Cucujiformia
- Family: Cerambycidae
- Genus: Dorcadion
- Species: D. divisum

Binomial name
- Dorcadion divisum Germar, 1839

Synonyms
- Pedestredorcadion divisum (Germar) Sama, 2002

Species of beetle

Dorcadion divisum is a species of beetle in the family Cerambycidae. It was described by Ernst Friedrich Germar in 1839. It is known from Greece and Turkey.

== Subspecies ==
- Dorcadion divisum bleusei Pic, 1899
- Dorcadion divisum chioticum Breuning, 1946
- Dorcadion divisum dissimile Ganglbauer, 1883
- Dorcadion divisum divisum Germar, 1839
- Dorcadion divisum loratum Thomson, 1867
- Dorcadion divisum mytilinense Kraatz, 1873
- Dorcadion divisum parteinterruptum Breuning, 1962
- Dorcadion divisum subdivisum Breuning, 1955
