= Harpalus brevicornis =

Scientific classification
- Kingdom: Animalia
- Phylum: Arthropoda
- Class: Insecta
- Order: Coleoptera
- Suborder: Adephaga
- Family: Carabidae
- Genus: Harpalus
- Species: H. brevicornis

Binomial name
- Harpalus brevicornis Germar, 1824

Species of beetle

Harpalus brevicornis is a species of ground beetle in the subfamily Harpalinae. It was described by Ernst Friedrich Germar in 1824.
