= Carabus melancholicus costatus =

Scientific classification
- Domain: Eukaryota
- Kingdom: Animalia
- Phylum: Arthropoda
- Class: Insecta
- Order: Coleoptera
- Suborder: Adephaga
- Family: Carabidae
- Genus: Carabus
- Species: C. melancholicus
- Subspecies: C. m. costatus

Trinomial name
- Carabus melancholicus costatus Germar, 1824

Subspecies of beetle

Carabus melancholicus costatus is a species of beetle in the family Carabidae that can be found in France, Portugal, and Spain. They are brownish-black coloured.
