= Dorcadion decipiens =

Scientific classification
- Kingdom: Animalia
- Phylum: Arthropoda
- Clade: Pancrustacea
- Class: Insecta
- Order: Coleoptera
- Suborder: Polyphaga
- Infraorder: Cucujiformia
- Family: Cerambycidae
- Genus: Dorcadion
- Species: D. decipiens

Binomial name
- Dorcadion decipiens Germar, 1824

Synonyms
- Autodorcadion decipiens; Lamia decipiens Germar, 1824; Pedestredorcadion decipiens (Germar) Sama, 2002

Species of beetle

Dorcadion decipiens is a species of beetle in the family Cerambycidae. It was described by Ernst Friedrich Germar in 1824. It is known from Romania, Hungary, Serbia, Slovakia (from which it is considered to be extinct), Moldova, and Ukraine. It reaches a length of 12 to 14 mm (0.47 to 0.55 in).
