= Eutrypanus mucoreus =

Scientific classification
- Domain: Eukaryota
- Kingdom: Animalia
- Phylum: Arthropoda
- Class: Insecta
- Order: Coleoptera
- Suborder: Polyphaga
- Infraorder: Cucujiformia
- Family: Cerambycidae
- Genus: Eutrypanus
- Species: E. mucoreus

Binomial name
- Eutrypanus mucoreus (Bates, 1872)

Species of beetle

Eutrypanus mucoreus is a species of longhorn beetles of the subfamily Lamiinae. It was described by Bates in 1872, and is known from eastern Mexico, Colombia, Venezuela, and Ecuador.
