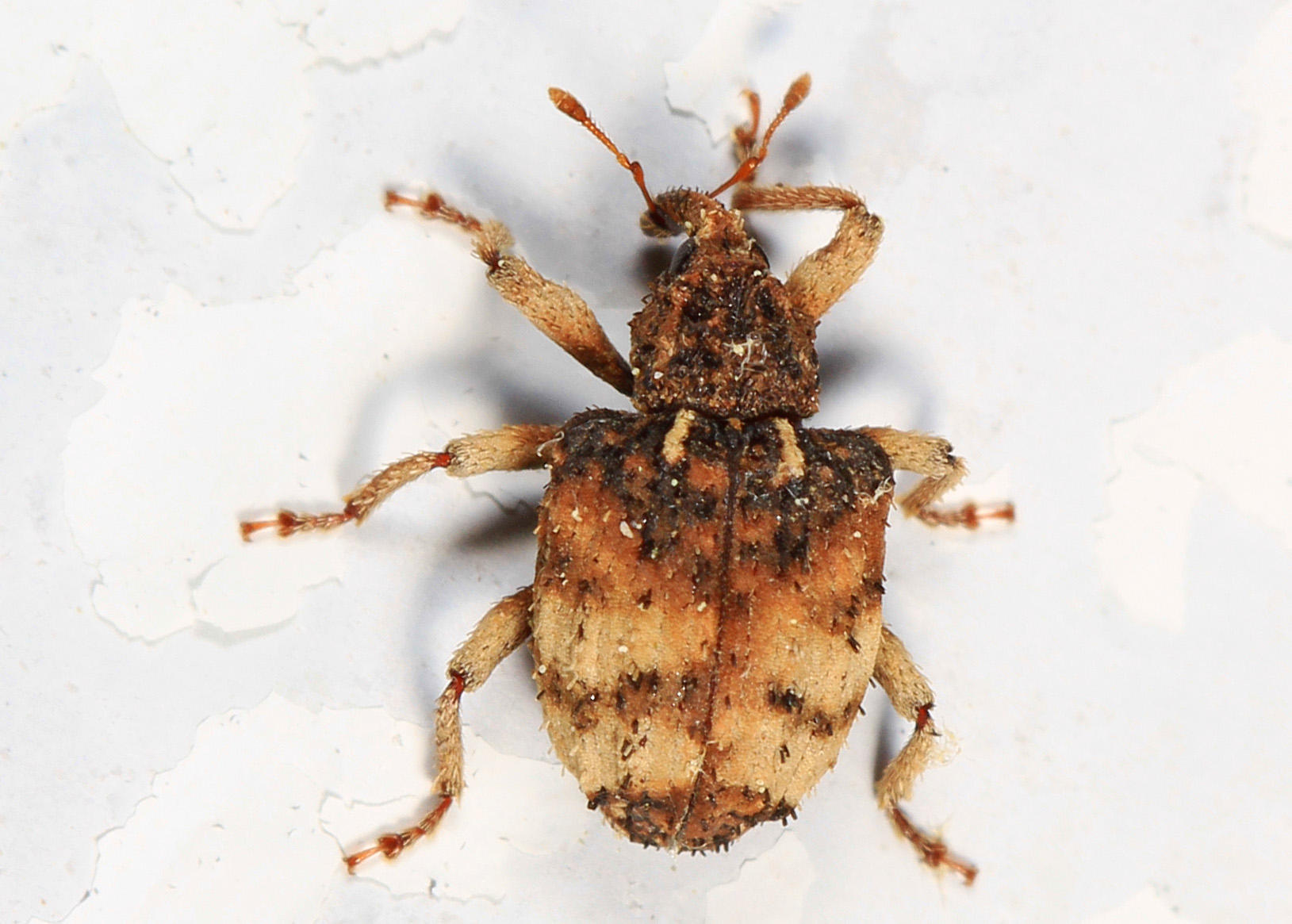
- Phyrdenus divergens

Scientific classification
- Kingdom: Animalia
- Phylum: Arthropoda
- Class: Insecta
- Order: Coleoptera
- Suborder: Polyphaga
- Infraorder: Cucujiformia
- Family: Curculionidae
- Subtribe: Cryptorhynchina
- Genus: Phyrdenus; LeConte, 1876

= Phyrdenus =

Genus of beetles

Phyrdenus is a genus of hidden snout weevils in the beetle family Curculionidae. There are more than 20 described species in Phyrdenus.

== Species ==
These 23 species belong to the genus Phyrdenus:

- Phyrdenus angusticollis Fiedler, 1952
- Phyrdenus boliviensis Hustache, 1924
- Phyrdenus bruchoides Fiedler, 1941
- Phyrdenus bulbifer Fiedler, 1952
- Phyrdenus bullatus Casey, 1892
- Phyrdenus carinicollis Fiedler, 1943
- Phyrdenus caseyi Faust, 1896
- Phyrdenus conotracheloides Blatchley, 1922
- Phyrdenus cryptacruroides Fiedler, 1941
- Phyrdenus divergens (Germar, 1824)
- Phyrdenus diversus Faust, 1896
- Phyrdenus frater Fiedler, 1952
- Phyrdenus griseofasciatus Fiedler, 1943
- Phyrdenus griseus Fiedler, 1952
- Phyrdenus muriceus (Germar, 1824)
- Phyrdenus nigrosparsus Fiedler, 1952
- Phyrdenus pallidisignatus Voss, 1939
- Phyrdenus pallidus Fiedler, 1943
- Phyrdenus rufosquamosus Fiedler, 1943
- Phyrdenus setifer Champion, 1905
- Phyrdenus tincticollis Champion, 1905
- Phyrdenus tuberiferus Fiedler, 1943
- Phyrdenus undatus Leconte, 1876
