= Apagomera seclusa =

Scientific classification
- Domain: Eukaryota
- Kingdom: Animalia
- Phylum: Arthropoda
- Class: Insecta
- Order: Coleoptera
- Suborder: Polyphaga
- Infraorder: Cucujiformia
- Family: Cerambycidae
- Genus: Apagomera
- Species: A. seclusa

Binomial name
- Apagomera seclusa Lane, 1965

Species of beetle

Apagomera seclusa is a species of beetle in the family Cerambycidae. It was described by Lane in 1965. It is known from Brazil.
