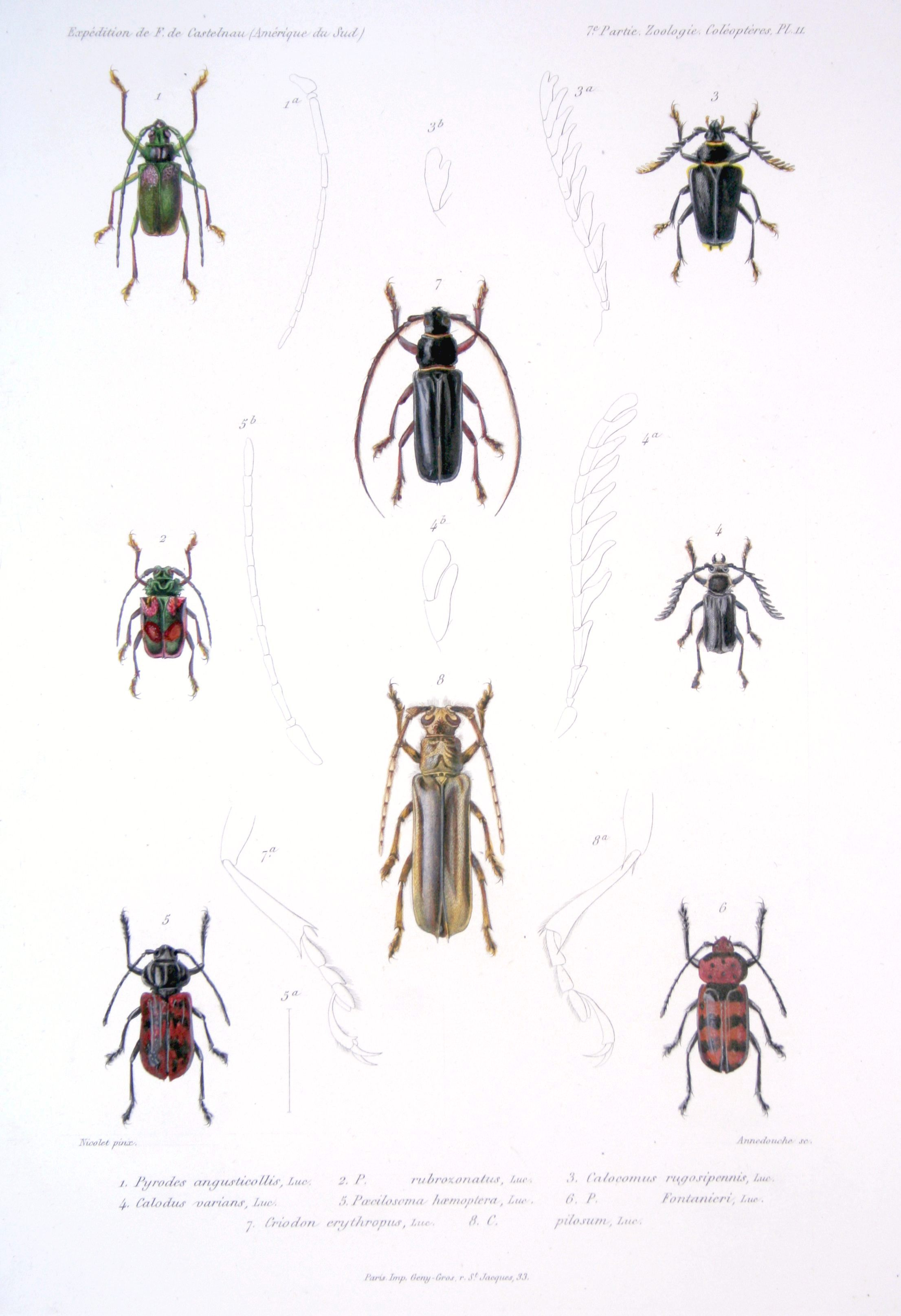

Scientific classification
- Domain: Eukaryota
- Kingdom: Animalia
- Phylum: Arthropoda
- Class: Insecta
- Order: Coleoptera
- Suborder: Polyphaga
- Infraorder: Cucujiformia
- Family: Cerambycidae
- Subfamily: Cerambycinae
- Tribe: Trachyderini
- Genus: Rachidion; Audinet-Serville, 1834

= Rachidion =

Genus of beetles

Rachidion is a genus of beetles in the family Cerambycidae, containing the following species:

- Rachidion gagatinum (Germar, 1824)
- Rachidion nigritum Audinet-Serville, 1834
- Rachidion obesum Newman, 1840
- Rachidion ramulicorne Lacordaire, 1869
