= Hylettus spilotus =

Scientific classification
- Domain: Eukaryota
- Kingdom: Animalia
- Phylum: Arthropoda
- Class: Insecta
- Order: Coleoptera
- Suborder: Polyphaga
- Infraorder: Cucujiformia
- Family: Cerambycidae
- Genus: Hylettus
- Species: H. spilotus

Binomial name
- Hylettus spilotus Monné, 1982

Species of beetle

Hylettus spilotus is a species of longhorn beetles of the subfamily Lamiinae. It was described by Miguel A. Monné in 1982, and is known from eastern Ecuador, Peru, eastern central Brazil, and French Guiana.
