= Rhinotragus analis =

Scientific classification
- Kingdom: Animalia
- Phylum: Arthropoda
- Class: Insecta
- Order: Coleoptera
- Suborder: Polyphaga
- Infraorder: Cucujiformia
- Family: Cerambycidae
- Genus: Rhinotragus
- Species: R. analis

Binomial name
- Rhinotragus analis Audinet-Serville, 1833

Species of beetle

Rhinotragus analis is a species of beetle in the family Cerambycidae. It was described by Jean Guillaume Audinet-Serville in 1833.
