= Apagomera bravoi =

Scientific classification
- Domain: Eukaryota
- Kingdom: Animalia
- Phylum: Arthropoda
- Class: Insecta
- Order: Coleoptera
- Suborder: Polyphaga
- Infraorder: Cucujiformia
- Family: Cerambycidae
- Genus: Apagomera
- Species: A. bravoi

Binomial name
- Apagomera bravoi Galileo & Martins, 2009

Species of beetle

Apagomera bravoi is a species of beetle in the family Cerambycidae. It was described by Galileo and Martins in 2009. It is known from Brazil.
