= Neoeutrypanus incertus =

Scientific classification
- Kingdom: Animalia
- Phylum: Arthropoda
- Class: Insecta
- Order: Coleoptera
- Suborder: Polyphaga
- Infraorder: Cucujiformia
- Family: Cerambycidae
- Genus: Neoeutrypanus
- Species: N. incertus

Binomial name
- Neoeutrypanus incertus (Bates, 1864)

Species of beetle

Neoeutrypanus incertus is a species of beetle in the family Cerambycidae. It was described by Bates in 1864.
