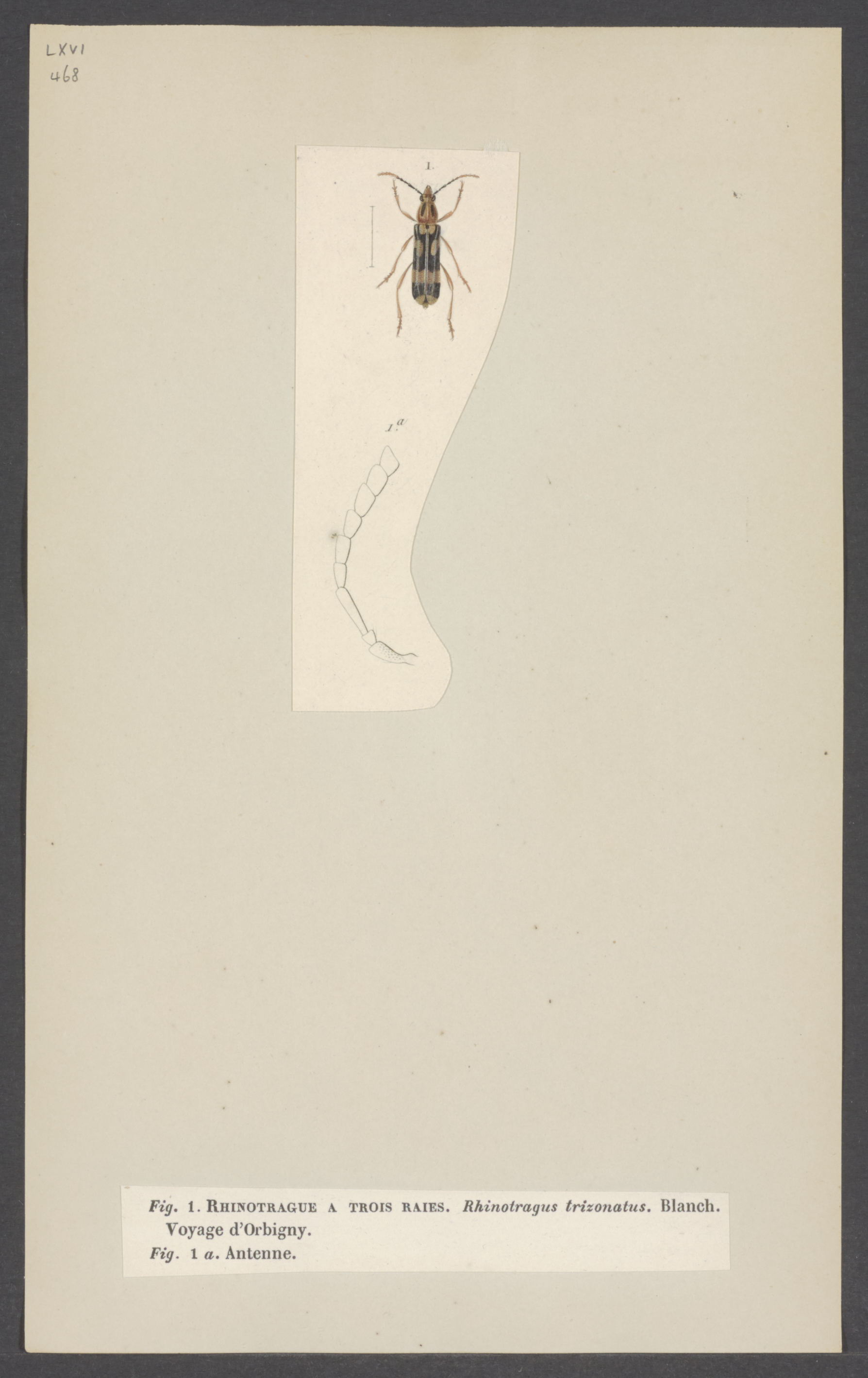

Scientific classification
- Kingdom: Animalia
- Phylum: Arthropoda
- Clade: Pancrustacea
- Class: Insecta
- Order: Coleoptera
- Suborder: Polyphaga
- Infraorder: Cucujiformia
- Family: Cerambycidae
- Tribe: Rhinotragini
- Genus: Rhinotragus

= Rhinotragus =

Genus of beetles

Rhinotragus is a genus of beetles in the family Cerambycidae, containing the following species:

- Rhinotragus analis Audinet-Serville, 1833
- Rhinotragus antonioi Clarke, 2012
- Rhinotragus apicalis Guérin-Méneville, 1844
- Rhinotragus bizonatus Gounelle, 1911
- Rhinotragus conformis Monné & Fragoso, 1990
- Rhinotragus dorsiger Germar, 1824
- Rhinotragus festivus Perty, 1832
- Rhinotragus longicollis Bates, 1880
- Rhinotragus lucasii Thomson, 1860
- Rhinotragus martinsi Penaherrera-Leiva & Tavakilian, 2003
- Rhinotragus monnei Clarke, 2012
- Rhinotragus robustus Penaherrera-Leiva & Tavakilian, 2003
- Rhinotragus sulphureus Giesbert, 1991
- Rhinotragus trilineatus White, 1855
- Rhinotragus trizonatus Blanchard in Griffith, 1832
