= Apagomera jaguarari =

Scientific classification
- Domain: Eukaryota
- Kingdom: Animalia
- Phylum: Arthropoda
- Class: Insecta
- Order: Coleoptera
- Suborder: Polyphaga
- Infraorder: Cucujiformia
- Family: Cerambycidae
- Genus: Apagomera
- Species: A. jaguarari

Binomial name
- Apagomera jaguarari Galileo & Martins, 1998

Species of beetle

Apagomera jaguarari is a species of beetle in the family Cerambycidae. It was described by Galileo and Martins in 1998. It is known from Brazil.
