= Rhinotragus trizonatus =

Scientific classification
- Kingdom: Animalia
- Phylum: Arthropoda
- Clade: Pancrustacea
- Class: Insecta
- Order: Coleoptera
- Suborder: Polyphaga
- Infraorder: Cucujiformia
- Family: Cerambycidae
- Genus: Rhinotragus
- Species: R. trizonatus

Binomial name
- Rhinotragus trizonatus Blanchard in Griffith, 1832

Species of beetle

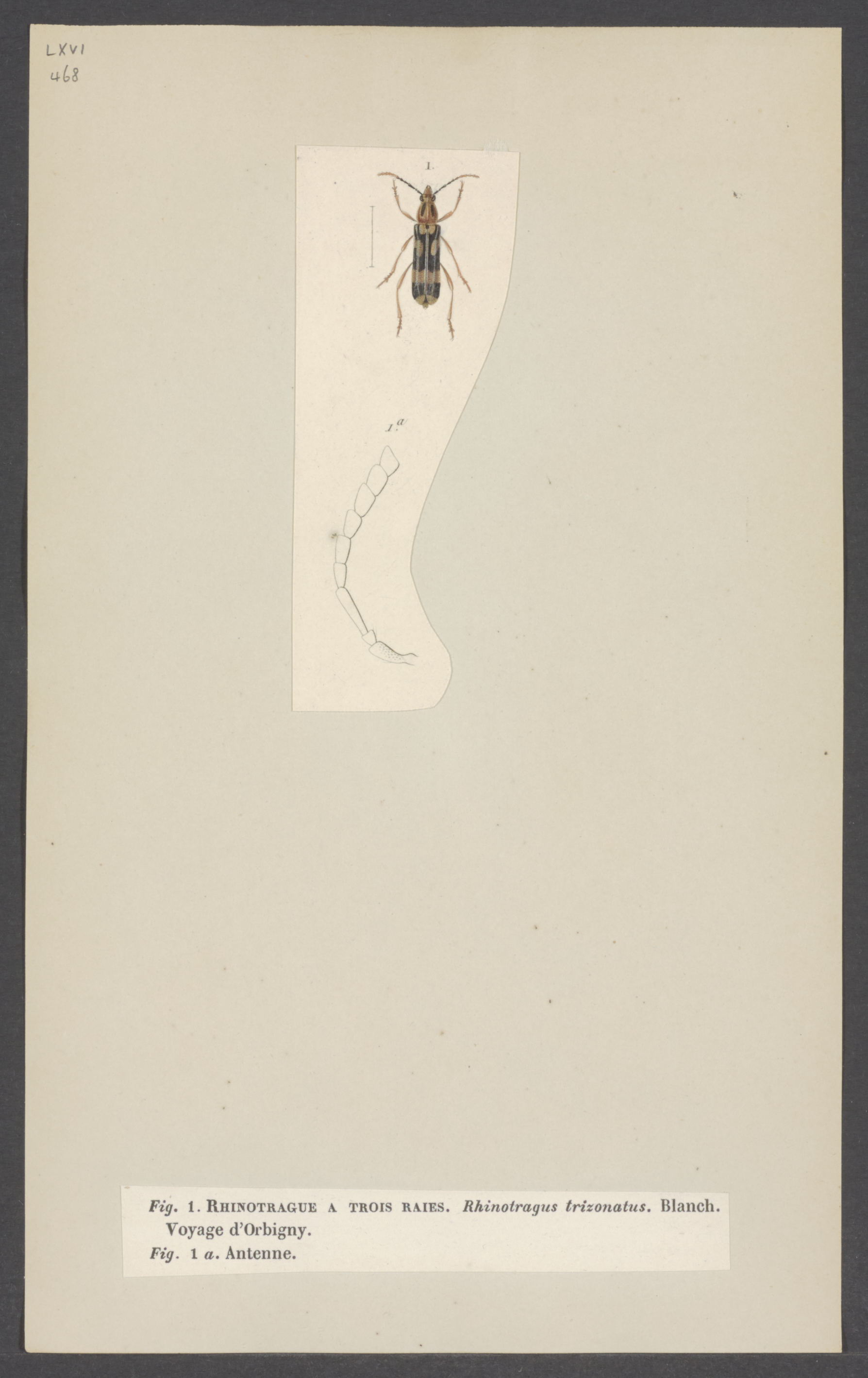
Rhinotragus

Rhinotragus trizonatus is a species of beetle in the family Cerambycidae. It was described by Blanchard in 1832.
