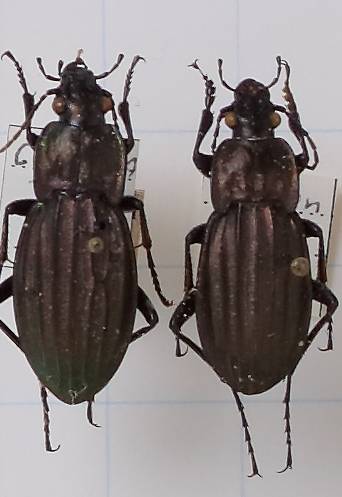
- Carabus melancholicus

Scientific classification
- Kingdom: Animalia
- Phylum: Arthropoda
- Clade: Pancrustacea
- Class: Insecta
- Order: Coleoptera
- Suborder: Adephaga
- Family: Carabidae
- Genus: Carabus
- Species: C. melancholicus

Binomial name
- Carabus melancholicus Fabricius, 1798

= Carabus melancholicus =

Species of beetle

Carabus melancholicus is a species of beetle from family Carabidae, found in France, Portugal, and Spain. They could also be found in Morocco. They are brownish-black coloured.

== Subspecies ==
- Carabus melancholicus costatus Germar, 1824
- Carabus melancholicus melancholicus Fabricius, 1798
- Carabus melancholicus submeridionalis Breuning, 1975
