= Sphallotrichus puncticollis =

Scientific classification
- Domain: Eukaryota
- Kingdom: Animalia
- Phylum: Arthropoda
- Class: Insecta
- Order: Coleoptera
- Suborder: Polyphaga
- Infraorder: Cucujiformia
- Family: Cerambycidae
- Subfamily: Cerambycinae
- Tribe: Cerambycini
- Genus: Sphallotrichus
- Species: S. puncticollis

Binomial name
- Sphallotrichus puncticollis (Bates, 1870)

Synonyms
- Sphallenum puncticolle Blackwelder, 1946; Sphallotrichus puncticolle Touroult et al., 2010; Sphallotrichus puncticolle puncticolle Monné & Hovore, 2006; Sphallotrichus puncticollis puncticollis Barreto, Machiner & Smiderle, 2013

Species of beetle

Sphallotrichus puncticollis is a species in the longhorn beetle family Cerambycidae. It is known from Nicaragua, French Guiana, Panama, Colombia, Costa Rica, Ecuador, and Peru. This species has subspecies, Sphallotrichus puncticollis robustus and Sphallotrichus puncticollis puncticollis.
