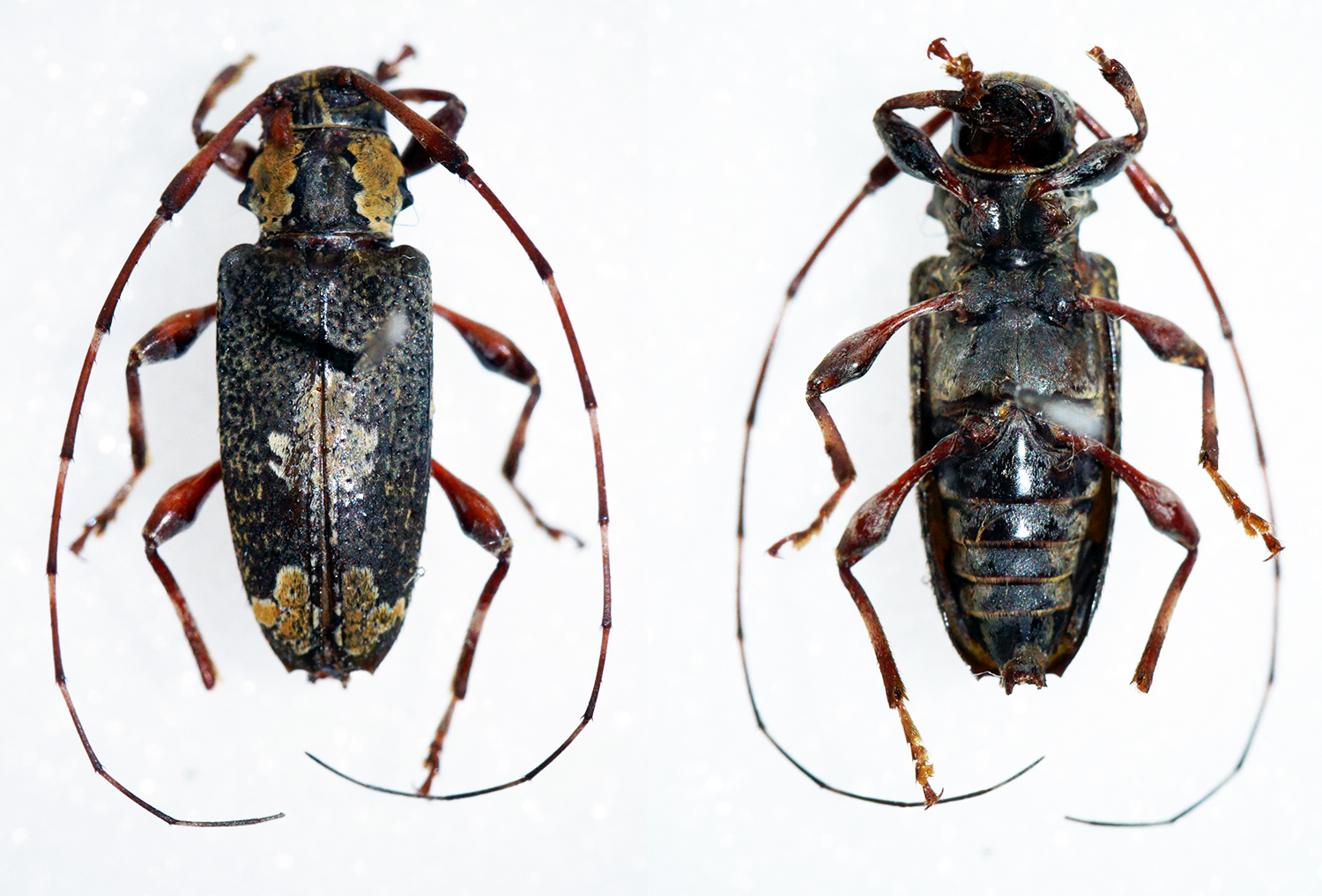
- Neoeutrypanius nobilis

Scientific classification
- Kingdom: Animalia
- Phylum: Arthropoda
- Class: Insecta
- Order: Coleoptera
- Suborder: Polyphaga
- Infraorder: Cucujiformia
- Family: Cerambycidae
- Tribe: Acanthocinini
- Genus: Neoeutrypanus

= Neoeutrypanus =

Genus of beetles

Neoeutrypanus is a genus of beetles in the family Cerambycidae containing the following species:

- Neoeutrypanus decorus (Bates, 1881)
- Neoeutrypanus generosus (Monné & Martins, 1976)
- Neoeutrypanus glaucus (Melzer, 1931)
- Neoeutrypanus incertus (Bates, 1864)
- Neoeutrypanus inustus (Monné & Martins, 1976)
- Neoeutrypanus maculatus Monné, 1985
- Neoeutrypanus mutilatus (Germar, 1824)
- Neoeutrypanus nitidus (White, 1855)
- Neoeutrypanus nobilis (Bates, 1864)
- Neoeutrypanus sobrinus (Melzer, 1935)
