= Hylettus magnus =

Scientific classification
- Domain: Eukaryota
- Kingdom: Animalia
- Phylum: Arthropoda
- Class: Insecta
- Order: Coleoptera
- Suborder: Polyphaga
- Infraorder: Cucujiformia
- Family: Cerambycidae
- Genus: Hylettus
- Species: H. magnus

Binomial name
- Hylettus magnus Monné, 1988

Species of beetle

Hylettus magnus is a species of longhorn beetles of the subfamily Lamiinae. It was described by Monné in 1988, and is known from western central Brazil.
