= Rhinotragus conformis =

Scientific classification
- Kingdom: Animalia
- Phylum: Arthropoda
- Class: Insecta
- Order: Coleoptera
- Suborder: Polyphaga
- Infraorder: Cucujiformia
- Family: Cerambycidae
- Genus: Rhinotragus
- Species: R. conformis

Binomial name
- Rhinotragus conformis Monné & Fragoso, 1990

Species of beetle

Rhinotragus conformis is a species of beetle in the family Cerambycidae. It was described by Monné and Fragoso in 1990.
