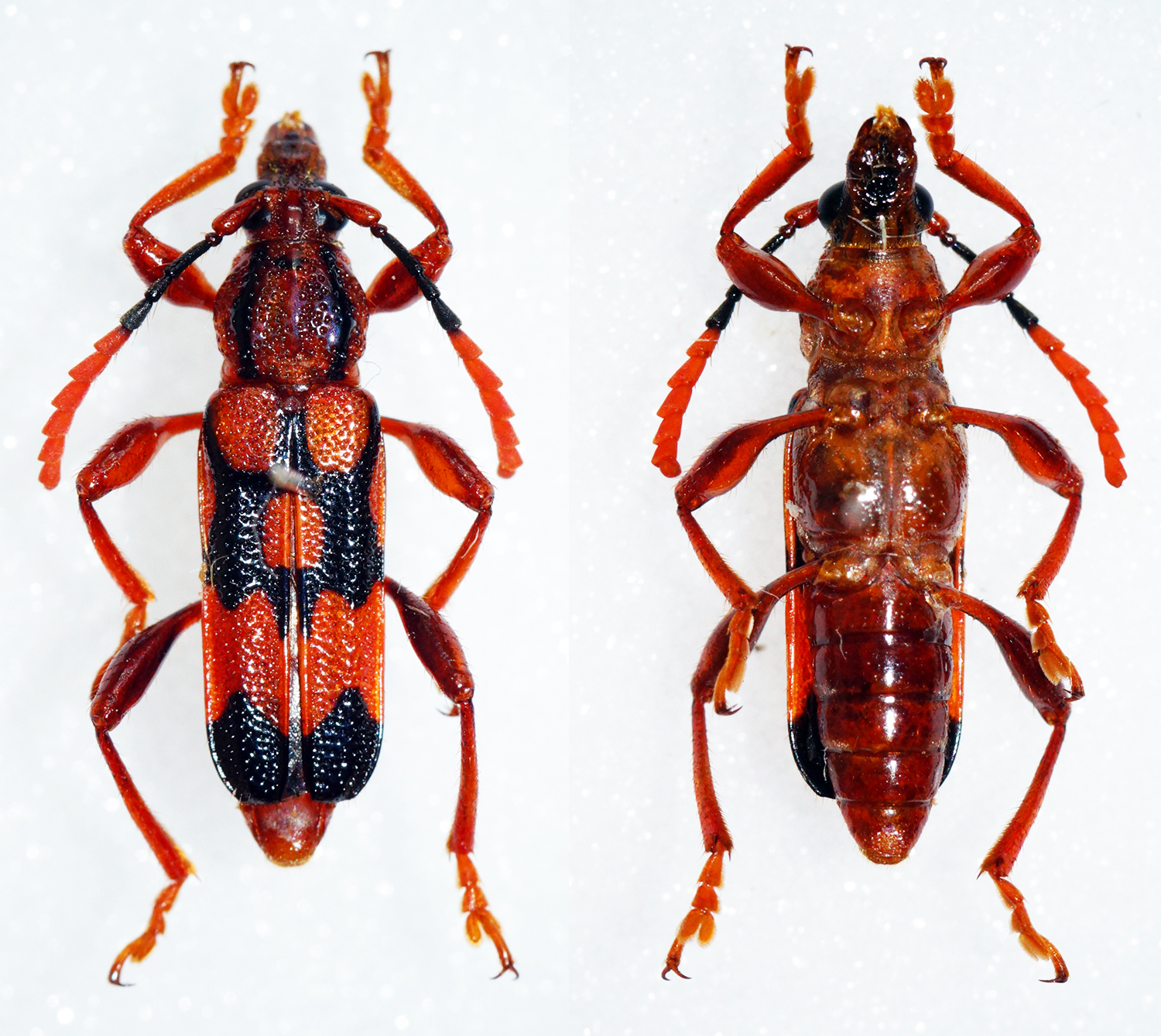

Scientific classification
- Kingdom: Animalia
- Phylum: Arthropoda
- Clade: Pancrustacea
- Class: Insecta
- Order: Coleoptera
- Suborder: Polyphaga
- Infraorder: Cucujiformia
- Family: Cerambycidae
- Genus: Rhinotragus
- Species: R. lucasii

Binomial name
- Rhinotragus lucasii Thomson, 1860

= Rhinotragus lucasii =

Species of beetle

Rhinotragus lucasii is a species of beetle in the family Cerambycidae. It was described by Thomson in 1860.
