= Carabus melancholicus submeridionalis =

Scientific classification
- Kingdom: Animalia
- Phylum: Arthropoda
- Class: Insecta
- Order: Coleoptera
- Suborder: Adephaga
- Family: Carabidae
- Genus: Carabus
- Species: C. melancholicus
- Subspecies: C. m. submeridionalis

Trinomial name
- Carabus melancholicus submeridionalis Breuning, 1975

Synonyms
- Carabus melancholicus dehesicola Garcia-Paris & Paris, 1996

Subspecies of beetle

Carabus melancholicus submeridionalis is a species of beetle in the family Carabidae that can be found in Portugal and Spain. They are brownish-black coloured.
