= Hylettus alboplagiatus =

Scientific classification
- Domain: Eukaryota
- Kingdom: Animalia
- Phylum: Arthropoda
- Class: Insecta
- Order: Coleoptera
- Suborder: Polyphaga
- Infraorder: Cucujiformia
- Family: Cerambycidae
- Genus: Hylettus
- Species: H. alboplagiatus

Binomial name
- Hylettus alboplagiatus (White, 1855)

Species of beetle

Hylettus alboplagiatus is a species of longhorn beetles of the subfamily Lamiinae. It was described by White in 1855, and is known from Peru, eastern Ecuador, and northwestern Brazil.
