= Hylettus excelsus =

Scientific classification
- Domain: Eukaryota
- Kingdom: Animalia
- Phylum: Arthropoda
- Class: Insecta
- Order: Coleoptera
- Suborder: Polyphaga
- Infraorder: Cucujiformia
- Family: Cerambycidae
- Genus: Hylettus
- Species: H. excelsus

Binomial name
- Hylettus excelsus (Bates, 1864)

Species of beetle

Hylettus excelsus is a species of longhorn beetles of the subfamily Lamiinae. It was described by Henry Walter Bates in 1864, and is known from Ecuador, Peru, Brazil, and Bolivia.
