= Sphallotrichus bidens =

Scientific classification
- Domain: Eukaryota
- Kingdom: Animalia
- Phylum: Arthropoda
- Class: Insecta
- Order: Coleoptera
- Suborder: Polyphaga
- Infraorder: Cucujiformia
- Family: Cerambycidae
- Subfamily: Cerambycinae
- Tribe: Cerambycini
- Genus: Sphallotrichus
- Species: S. bidens

Binomial name
- Sphallotrichus bidens (Fabricius, 1801)

Synonyms
- Cerambyx bidens Schönherr, 1817; Cerambyx lugubris Voet, 1778; Coleoxestia bidens Aurivillius, 1912; Criodion castanopterum White, 1853; Sphallenum castanopterum Aurivillius, 1912; Sphallenum femorale Blackwelder, 1946; Sphallenum lugubre Blackwelder, 1946; Sphallotrichus castanopterum Monné & Giesbert, 1994; Sphallotrichus femorale Monné & Giesbert, 1994; Sphallotrichus lugubre Fragoso, 1982

Species of beetle

Sphallotrichus bidens is a species in the longhorn beetle family Cerambycidae. It is found in Guyana, French Guiana, Venezuela, Brazil, Bolivia, and Suriname.

This species was described by Johan Christian Fabricius in 1801.
