= Sphallotrichus sericeotomentosus =

Scientific classification
- Domain: Eukaryota
- Kingdom: Animalia
- Phylum: Arthropoda
- Class: Insecta
- Order: Coleoptera
- Suborder: Polyphaga
- Infraorder: Cucujiformia
- Family: Cerambycidae
- Subfamily: Cerambycinae
- Tribe: Cerambycini
- Genus: Sphallotrichus
- Species: S. sericeotomentosus

Binomial name
- Sphallotrichus sericeotomentosus Fragoso, 1995

Species of beetle

Sphallotrichus sericeotomentosus is a species in the longhorn beetle family Cerambycidae. It is found in Bolivia and Brazil.
