= Hylettus hiekei =

Scientific classification
- Domain: Eukaryota
- Kingdom: Animalia
- Phylum: Arthropoda
- Class: Insecta
- Order: Coleoptera
- Suborder: Polyphaga
- Infraorder: Cucujiformia
- Family: Cerambycidae
- Genus: Hylettus
- Species: H. hiekei

Binomial name
- Hylettus hiekei E. Fuchs, 1970

Species of beetle

Hylettus hiekei is a species of longhorn beetle of the subfamily Lamiinae. It was described by Ernst Fuchs in 1970 and is known from Ecuador and Colombia.
