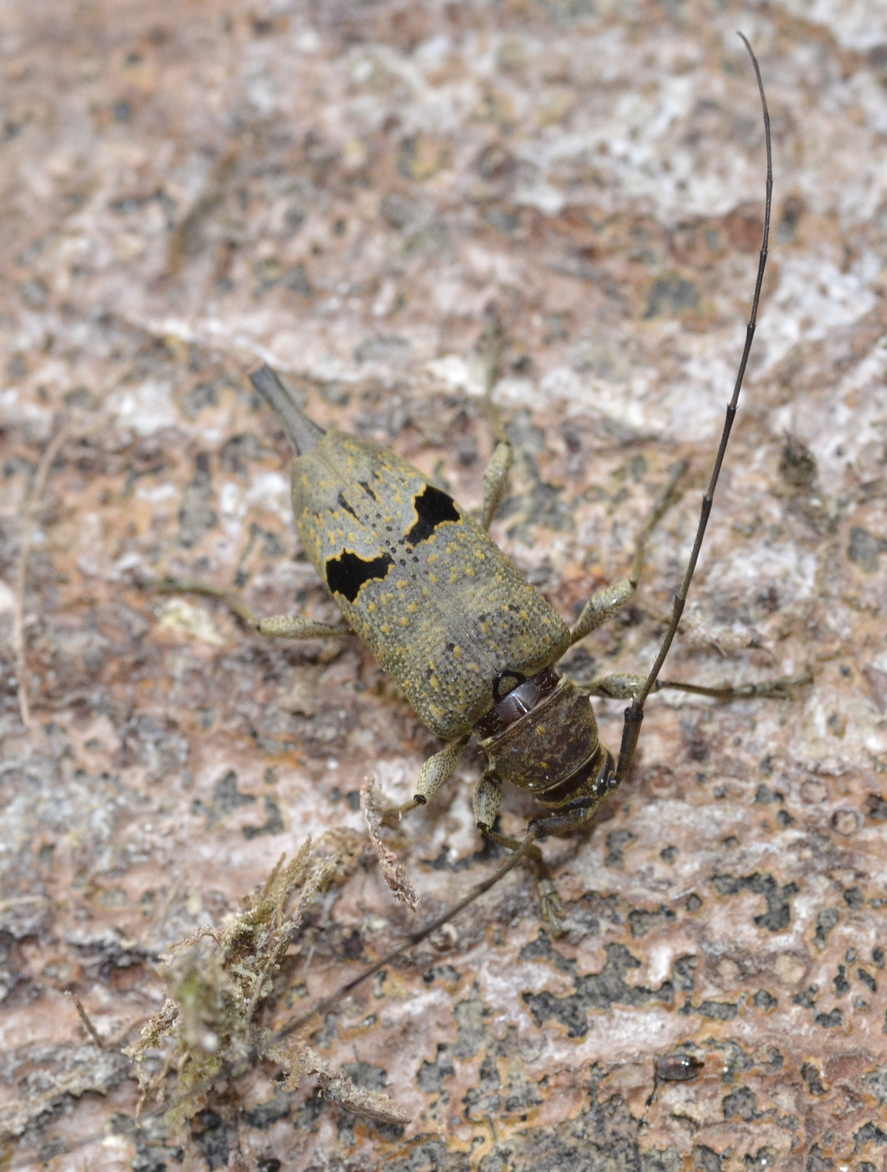

Scientific classification
- Kingdom: Animalia
- Phylum: Arthropoda
- Class: Insecta
- Order: Coleoptera
- Suborder: Polyphaga
- Infraorder: Cucujiformia
- Family: Cerambycidae
- Genus: Hylettus
- Species: H. coenobita

Binomial name
- Hylettus coenobita (Erichson, 1847)

= Hylettus coenobita =

Species of beetle

Hylettus coenobita is a species of longhorn beetles of the subfamily Lamiinae. It was described by Wilhelm Ferdinand Erichson in 1847, and is known from Guatemala, Panama, Brazil, Bolivia, Peru, eastern Ecuador, and French Guiana.
