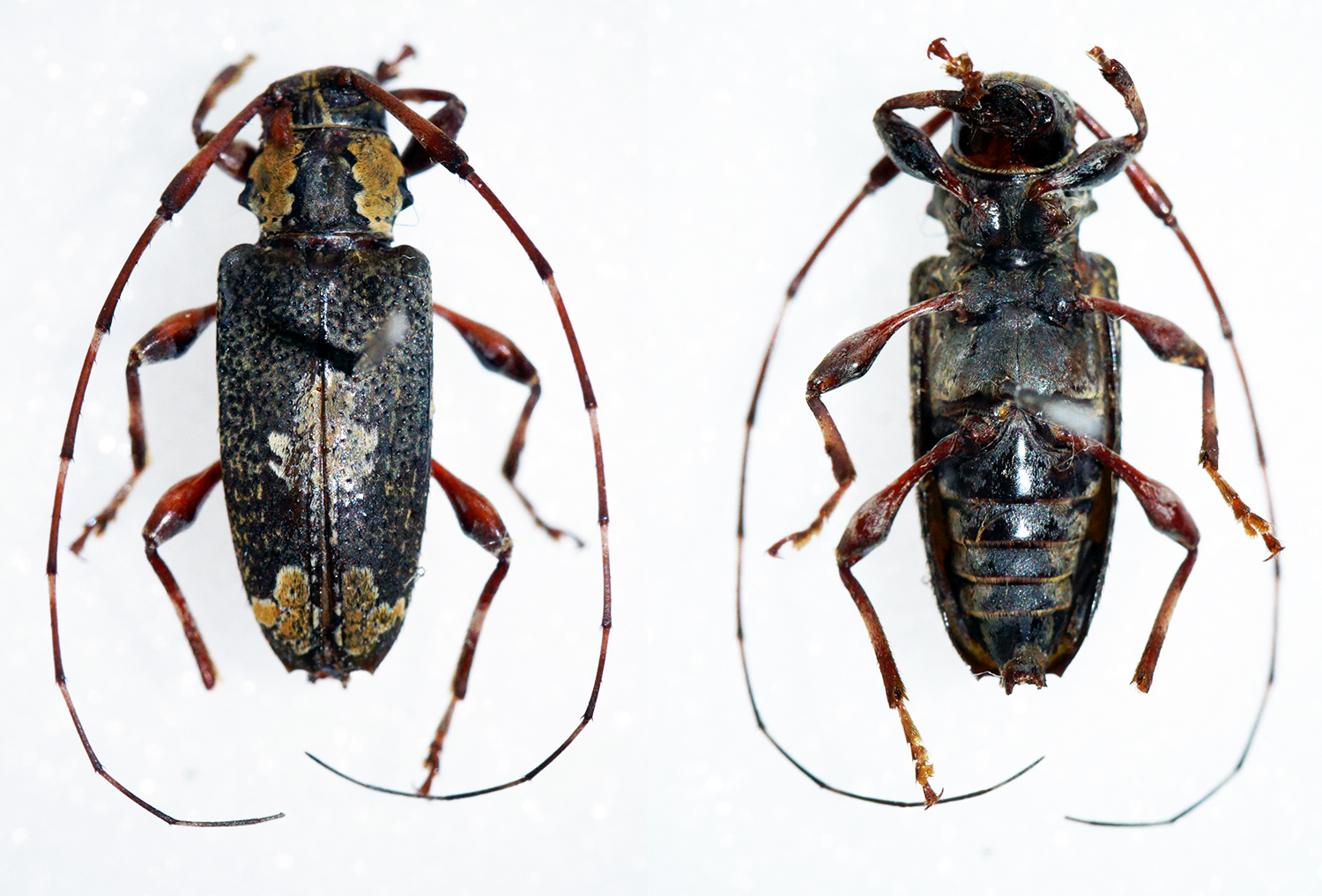

Scientific classification
- Kingdom: Animalia
- Phylum: Arthropoda
- Class: Insecta
- Order: Coleoptera
- Suborder: Polyphaga
- Infraorder: Cucujiformia
- Family: Cerambycidae
- Genus: Neoeutrypanus
- Species: N. nobilis

Binomial name
- Neoeutrypanus nobilis (Bates, 1864)

= Neoeutrypanus nobilis =

Species of beetle

Neoeutrypanus nobilis is a species of beetle in the family Cerambycidae. It was described by Bates in 1864.
