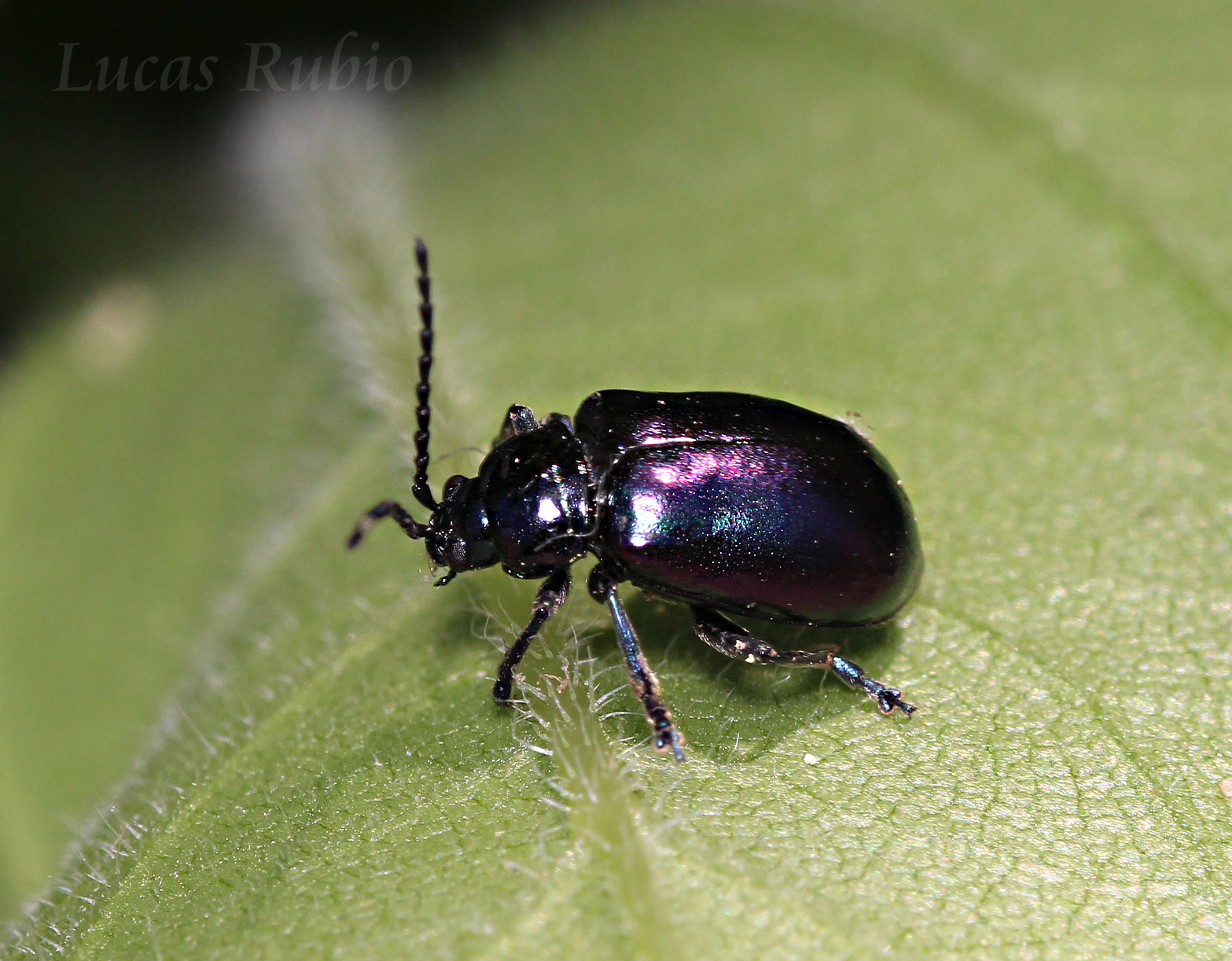
- Macrohaltica transversa, Argentina

Scientific classification
- Kingdom: Animalia
- Phylum: Arthropoda
- Class: Insecta
- Order: Coleoptera
- Suborder: Polyphaga
- Infraorder: Cucujiformia
- Family: Chrysomelidae
- Subfamily: Galerucinae
- Tribe: Alticini
- Genus: Macrohaltica; Bechyné, 1957

= Macrohaltica =

Genus of flea beetles

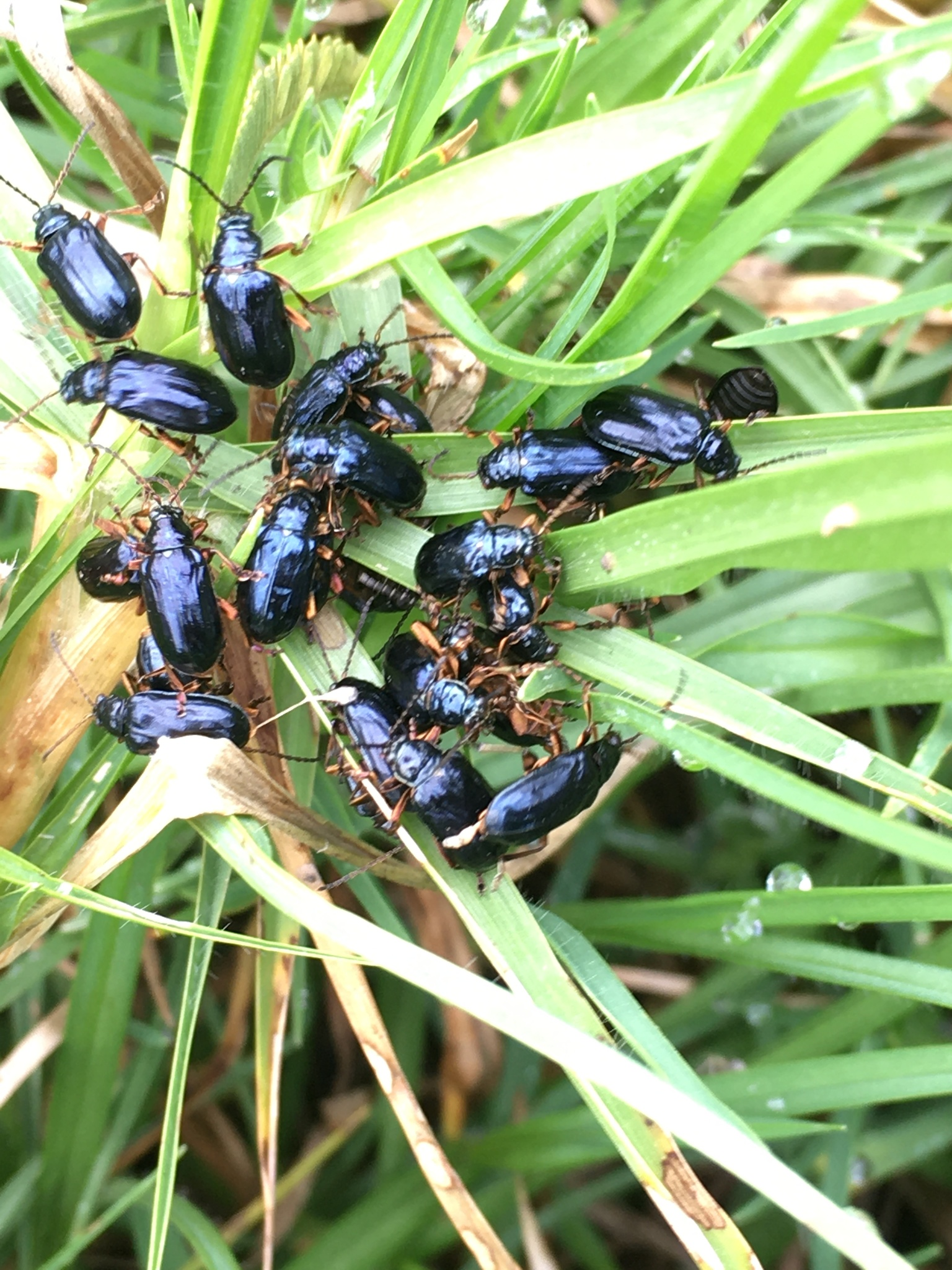
Macrohaltica, Colombia

Macrohaltica is a genus of flea beetles in the family Chrysomelidae. There are about 20 described species in Macrohaltica, found in Central and South America.

== Species ==
These 20 species belong to the genus Macrohaltica:

- Macrohaltica aequifacta Bechyné & Bechyné, 1961 (Ecuador and Southern Colombia)
- Macrohaltica amethystina (Olivier, 1808) (Caribbean)
- Macrohaltica complicata (Harold, 1875) (Mexico)
- Macrohaltica convexicollis (Harold, 1880) (South America)
- Macrohaltica costata (Erichson, 1847) (South America)
- Macrohaltica crypta Santisteban, 2006 (Costa Rica and Panamá)
- Macrohaltica gregaria (Harold, 1875) (Colombia and Venezuela)
- Macrohaltica guatemalensis (Jacoby, 1884) (Mexico)
- Macrohaltica jamaicensis (Fabricius, 1792) (Caribbean, Central and South America)
- Macrohaltica janthina (Blanchard, 1851) (Chile)
- Macrohaltica languida (Harold, 1875) (South America)
- Macrohaltica mexicana (Jacoby, 1884) (Mexico)
- Macrohaltica papas Asenjo & Figueroa, 2017 (Colombia)
- Macrohaltica patruelis (Harold, 1875) (México and Guatemala)
- Macrohaltica plicata (Erichson, 1847) (South America)
- Macrohaltica puruchuco Asenjo & Figueroa, 2017 (South America)
- Macrohaltica salvadorensis (Bechyné & Bechyné, 1960) (Central America)
- Macrohaltica steihanseni Asenjo & Figueroa, 2017 (South America)
- Macrohaltica transversa (Germar, 1824) (South America)
- Macrohaltica weyrauchi (Bechyné, 1956) (South America)
