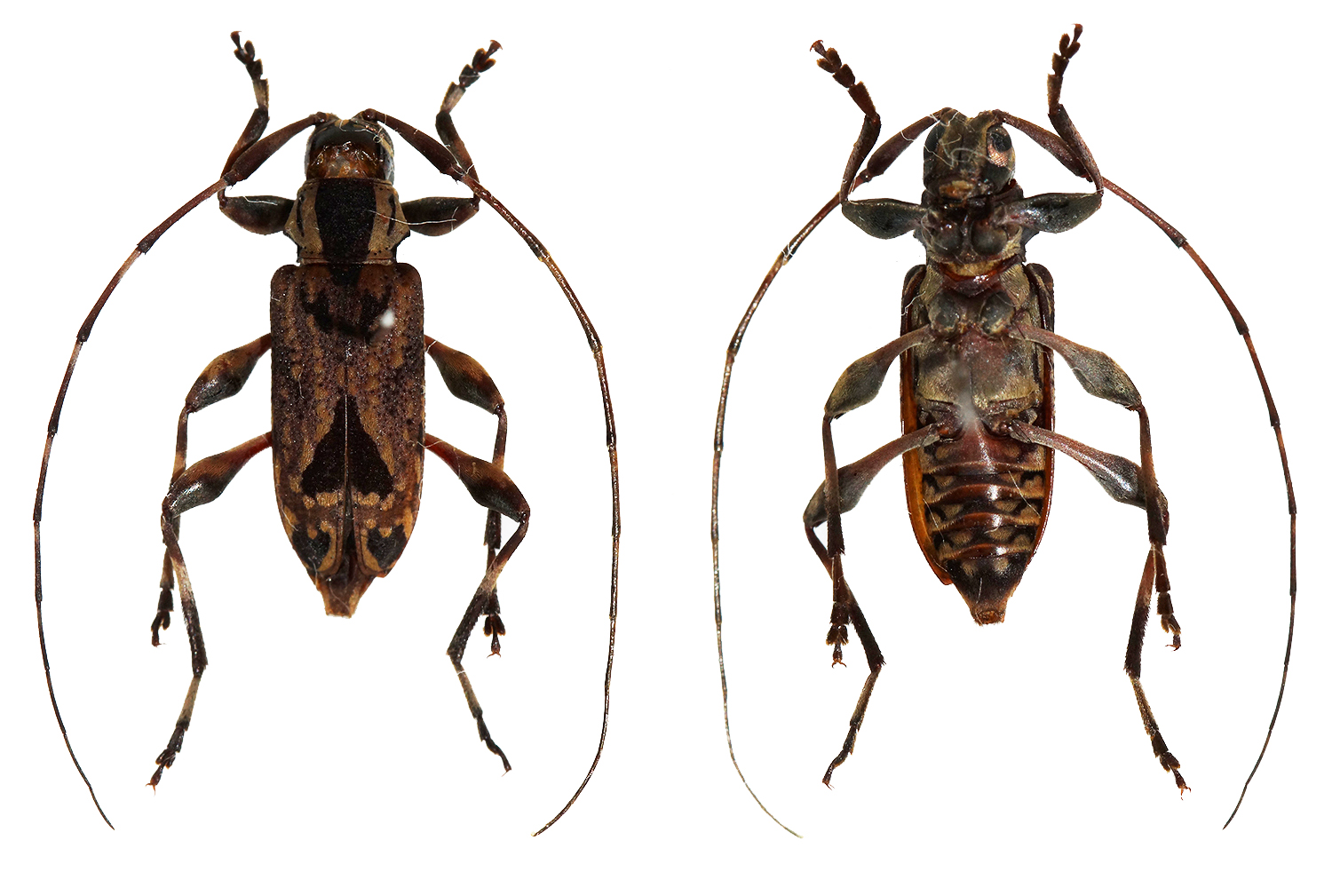
- Eutrypanus triangulifer

Scientific classification
- Kingdom: Animalia
- Phylum: Arthropoda
- Class: Insecta
- Order: Coleoptera
- Suborder: Polyphaga
- Infraorder: Cucujiformia
- Family: Cerambycidae
- Tribe: Acanthocinini
- Genus: Eutrypanus

= Eutrypanus =

Genus of beetles

Eutrypanus is a genus of beetles in the family Cerambycidae, containing the following species:

- Eutrypanus dorsalis (Germar, 1824)
- Eutrypanus mucoreus (Bates, 1872)
- Eutrypanus signaticornis (Laporte, 1840)
- Eutrypanus tessellatus White, 1855
- Eutrypanus triangulifer Erichson, 1847
