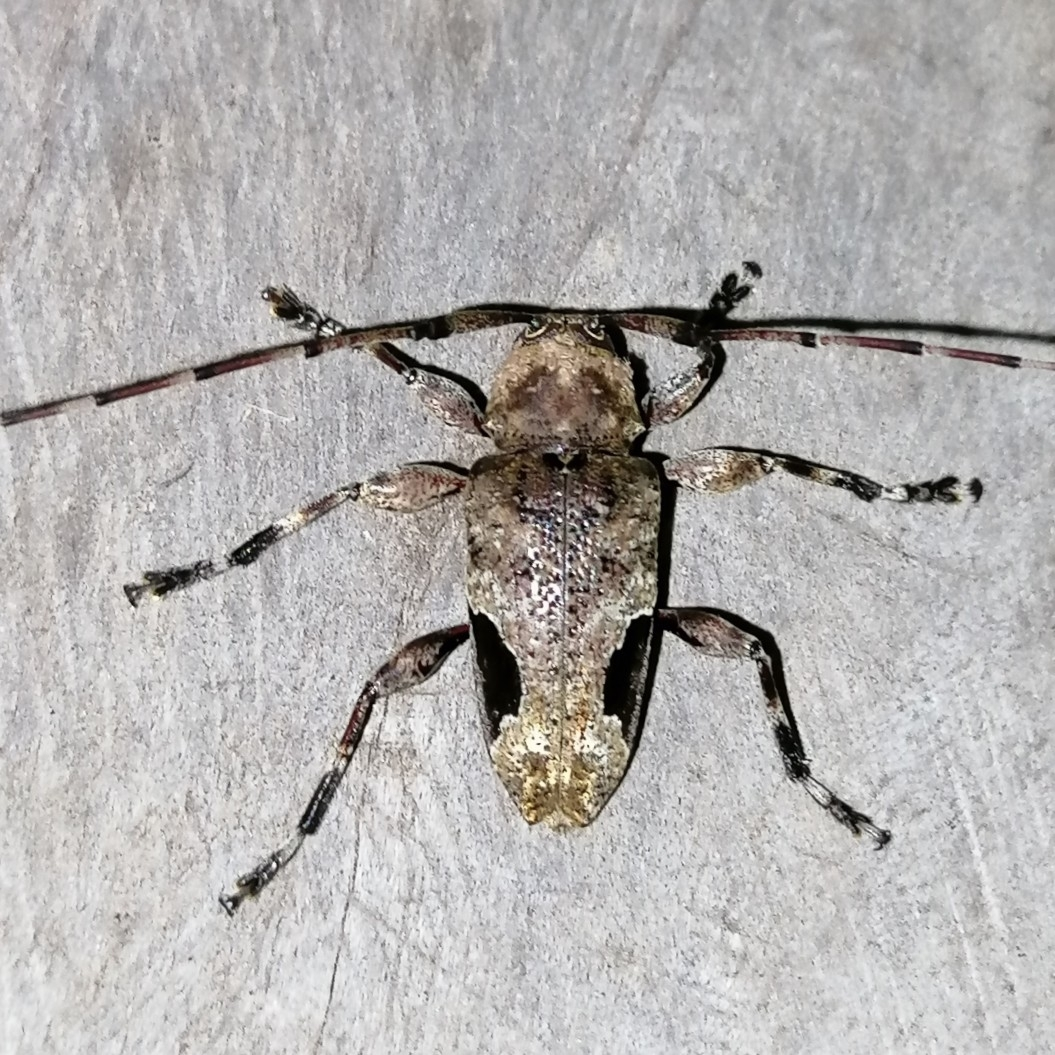
- Hylettus seniculus

Scientific classification
- Domain: Eukaryota
- Kingdom: Animalia
- Phylum: Arthropoda
- Class: Insecta
- Order: Coleoptera
- Suborder: Polyphaga
- Infraorder: Cucujiformia
- Family: Cerambycidae
- Subfamily: Lamiinae
- Tribe: Acanthocinini
- Genus: Hylettus; Bates, 1864

= Hylettus =

Genus of beetles

Hylettus is a genus of beetles in the family Cerambycidae, containing the following species:

- Hylettus alboplagiatus (White, 1855)
- Hylettus aureopilosus Monné, 1988
- Hylettus coenobita (Erichson, 1847)
- Hylettus eremita (Erichson, 1847)
- Hylettus excelsus (Bates, 1864)
- Hylettus griseofasciatus (Audinet-Serville, 1835)
- Hylettus hiekei Fuchs, 1970
- Hylettus magnus Monné, 1988
- Hylettus nebulosus Monné, 1982
- Hylettus paraleucus Monné, 1988
- Hylettus ramea (Bates, 1864)
- Hylettus seniculus (Germar, 1824)
- Hylettus spilotus Monné, 1982
- Hylettus stigmosus Monné, 1982
