= Rachidion obesum =

Scientific classification
- Domain: Eukaryota
- Kingdom: Animalia
- Phylum: Arthropoda
- Class: Insecta
- Order: Coleoptera
- Suborder: Polyphaga
- Infraorder: Cucujiformia
- Family: Cerambycidae
- Genus: Rachidion
- Species: R. obesum

Binomial name
- Rachidion obesum Newman, 1840

Species of beetle

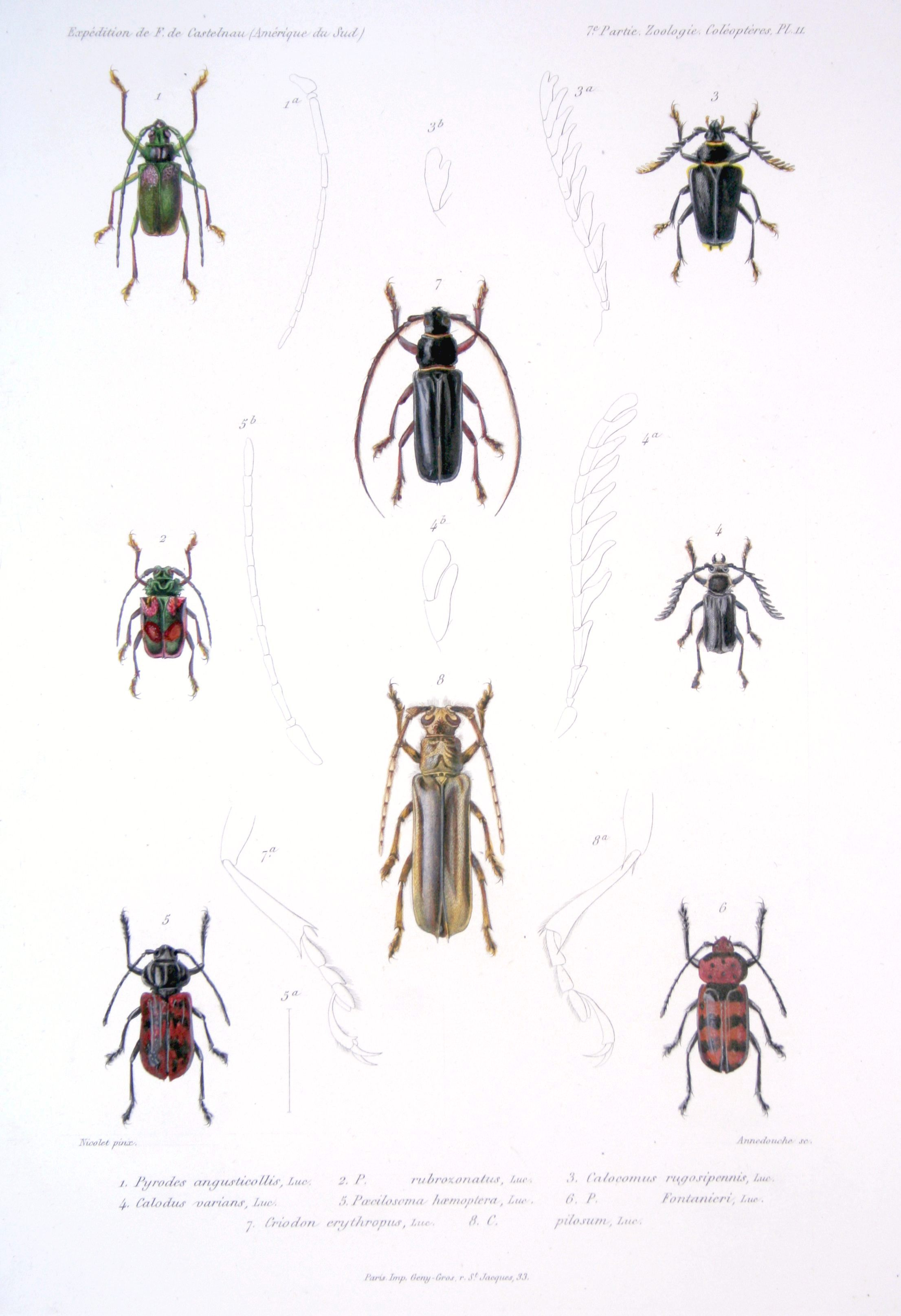

Rachidion obesum is a species of beetle in the family Cerambycidae. It was described by Newman in 1840.
