= Hylettus paraleucus =

Scientific classification
- Domain: Eukaryota
- Kingdom: Animalia
- Phylum: Arthropoda
- Class: Insecta
- Order: Coleoptera
- Suborder: Polyphaga
- Infraorder: Cucujiformia
- Family: Cerambycidae
- Genus: Hylettus
- Species: H. paraleucus

Binomial name
- Hylettus paraleucus Monné, 1988

Species of beetle

Hylettus paraleucus is a species of longhorn beetles of the subfamily Lamiinae. It was described by Monné in 1988, and is known from southeastern Brazil.
