= Hylettus eremita =

Scientific classification
- Kingdom: Animalia
- Phylum: Arthropoda
- Class: Insecta
- Order: Coleoptera
- Suborder: Polyphaga
- Infraorder: Cucujiformia
- Family: Cerambycidae
- Genus: Hylettus
- Species: H. eremita

Binomial name
- Hylettus eremita (Erichson, 1847)

Species of beetle

Hylettus eremita is a species of longhorn beetle of the subfamily Lamiinae. It was described by Wilhelm Ferdinand Erichson in 1847, and is known from Venezuela, Peru, Bolivia, and western Ecuador.
