= Sphallotrichus sculpticollis =

Scientific classification
- Domain: Eukaryota
- Kingdom: Animalia
- Phylum: Arthropoda
- Class: Insecta
- Order: Coleoptera
- Suborder: Polyphaga
- Infraorder: Cucujiformia
- Family: Cerambycidae
- Subfamily: Cerambycinae
- Tribe: Cerambycini
- Genus: Sphallotrichus
- Species: S. sculpticollis

Binomial name
- Sphallotrichus sculpticollis (Buquet, 1852)

Species of beetle

Sphallotrichus sculpticollis is a species in the longhorn beetle family Cerambycidae, found in Colombia.
