= Hylettus griseofasciatus =

Scientific classification
- Domain: Eukaryota
- Kingdom: Animalia
- Phylum: Arthropoda
- Class: Insecta
- Order: Coleoptera
- Suborder: Polyphaga
- Infraorder: Cucujiformia
- Family: Cerambycidae
- Genus: Hylettus
- Species: H. griseofasciatus

Binomial name
- Hylettus griseofasciatus (Audinet-Serville, 1835)

Species of beetle

Hylettus griseofasciatus is a species of longhorn beetles of the subfamily Lamiinae. It was described by Audinet-Serville in 1835, and is known from southeastern Brazil.
