= Sphallotrichus hirsuticornis =

Scientific classification
- Domain: Eukaryota
- Kingdom: Animalia
- Phylum: Arthropoda
- Class: Insecta
- Order: Coleoptera
- Suborder: Polyphaga
- Infraorder: Cucujiformia
- Family: Cerambycidae
- Subfamily: Cerambycinae
- Tribe: Cerambycini
- Genus: Sphallotrichus
- Species: S. hirsuticornis

Binomial name
- Sphallotrichus hirsuticornis Fragoso, 1995

Species of beetle

Sphallotrichus hirsuticornis is a species in the longhorn beetle family Cerambycidae, found in Ecuador.
