= Rhinotragus festivus =

Scientific classification
- Domain: Eukaryota
- Kingdom: Animalia
- Phylum: Arthropoda
- Class: Insecta
- Order: Coleoptera
- Suborder: Polyphaga
- Infraorder: Cucujiformia
- Family: Cerambycidae
- Genus: Rhinotragus
- Species: R. festivus

Binomial name
- Rhinotragus festivus Perty, 1832

Species of beetle

Rhinotragus festivus is a species of beetle in the family Cerambycidae. It was described by Perty in 1832.
