= Eutrypanus signaticornis =

Scientific classification
- Kingdom: Animalia
- Phylum: Arthropoda
- Class: Insecta
- Order: Coleoptera
- Suborder: Polyphaga
- Infraorder: Cucujiformia
- Family: Cerambycidae
- Genus: Eutrypanus
- Species: E. signaticornis

Binomial name
- Eutrypanus signaticornis (Laporte, 1840)

Species of beetle

Eutrypanus signaticornis is a species of longhorn beetles of the subfamily Lamiinae. It was described by Laporte in 1840, and is known from eastern Brazil.
