= Pyrobolus fumigatus =

Scientific classification
- Domain: Eukaryota
- Kingdom: Animalia
- Phylum: Arthropoda
- Class: Insecta
- Order: Coleoptera
- Suborder: Polyphaga
- Infraorder: Cucujiformia
- Family: Cerambycidae
- Genus: Pyrobolus
- Species: P. fumigatus

Binomial name
- Pyrobolus fumigatus (Germar, 1824)

Synonyms
- Cuiciuna fumigata (Germar, 1824)

Species of beetle

Pyrobolus fumigatus is a species of longhorn beetle in the family Cerambycidae. It was first described by Ernst Friedrich Germar in 1824. It is known from Brazil.
