= Rhinotragus bizonatus =

Scientific classification
- Kingdom: Animalia
- Phylum: Arthropoda
- Class: Insecta
- Order: Coleoptera
- Suborder: Polyphaga
- Infraorder: Cucujiformia
- Family: Cerambycidae
- Genus: Rhinotragus
- Species: R. bizonatus

Binomial name
- Rhinotragus bizonatus Gounelle, 1911

Species of beetle

Rhinotragus bizonatus is a species of beetle in the family Cerambycidae. It was described by Gounelle in 1911.
