= Sphallotrichus spadiceus =

Scientific classification
- Domain: Eukaryota
- Kingdom: Animalia
- Phylum: Arthropoda
- Class: Insecta
- Order: Coleoptera
- Suborder: Polyphaga
- Infraorder: Cucujiformia
- Family: Cerambycidae
- Subfamily: Cerambycinae
- Tribe: Cerambycini
- Genus: Sphallotrichus
- Species: S. spadiceus

Binomial name
- Sphallotrichus spadiceus (Gahan, 1892)

Synonyms
- Sphallenum setosum Bondar, 1930; Sphallenum spadiceum Duffy, 1960; Sphallotrichus spadiceum Monné & Giesbert, 1994

Species of beetle

Sphallotrichus spadiceus is a species in the longhorn beetle family Cerambycidae. It is found in Argentina and Brazil.
