= Apagomera =

Scientific classification
- Domain: Eukaryota
- Kingdom: Animalia
- Phylum: Arthropoda
- Class: Insecta
- Order: Coleoptera
- Suborder: Polyphaga
- Infraorder: Cucujiformia
- Family: Cerambycidae
- Subfamily: Lamiinae
- Tribe: Hemilophini
- Genus: Apagomera; Bates, 1881

Genus of beetles

Apagomera is a genus of longhorn beetles of the subfamily Lamiinae, containing the following species:

- Apagomera aereiventris (Tippmann, 1960)
- Apagomera bravoi Galileo & Martins, 2009
- Apagomera jaguarari Galileo & Martins, 1998
- Apagomera seclusa Lane, 1965
- Apagomera tipitinga Galileo & Martins, 1998
- Apagomera triangularis (Germar, 1824)
