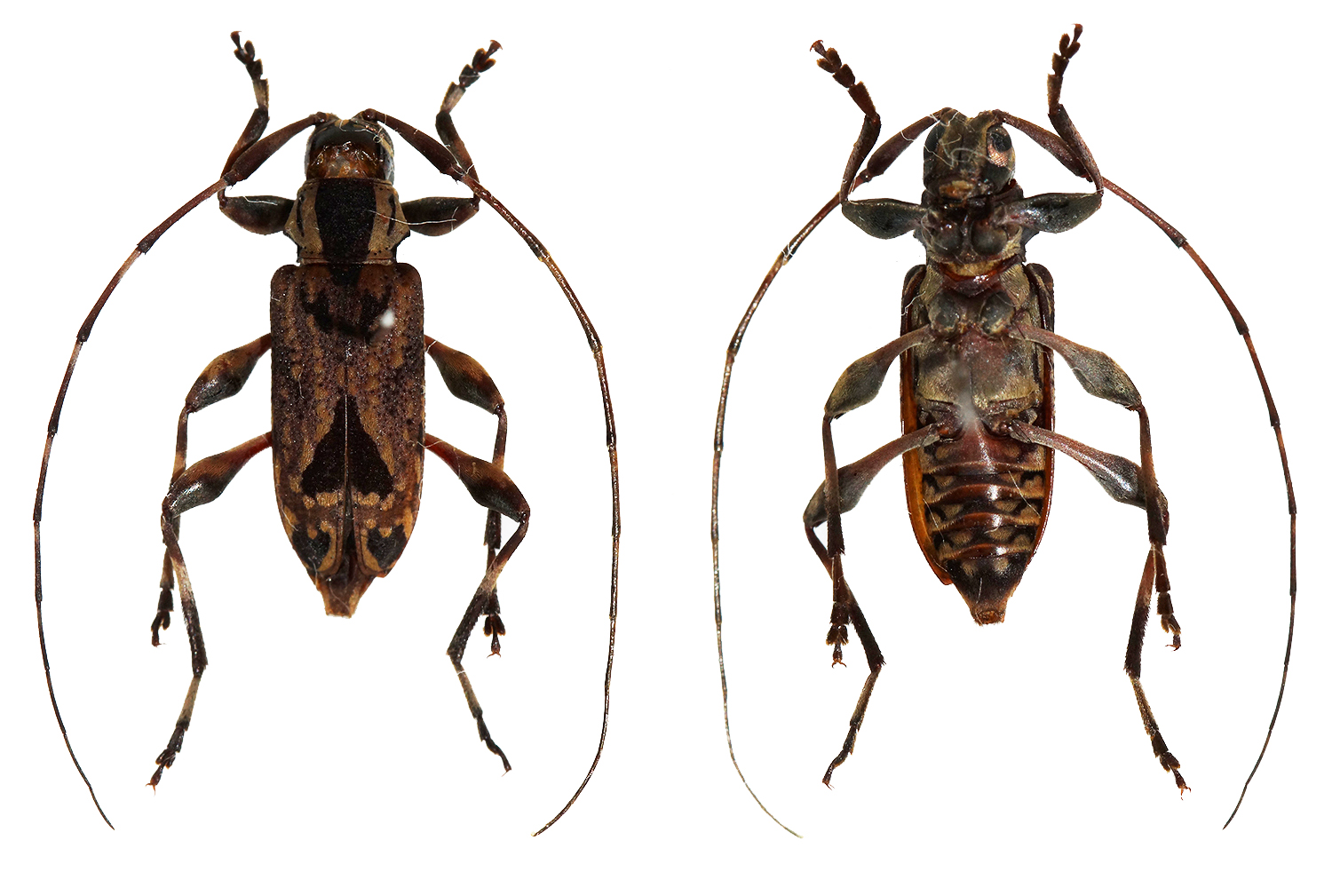

Scientific classification
- Kingdom: Animalia
- Phylum: Arthropoda
- Class: Insecta
- Order: Coleoptera
- Suborder: Polyphaga
- Infraorder: Cucujiformia
- Family: Cerambycidae
- Genus: Eutrypanus
- Species: E. triangulifer

Binomial name
- Eutrypanus triangulifer Erichson, 1847

= Eutrypanus triangulifer =

Species of beetle

Eutrypanus triangulifer is a species of longhorn beetle of the subfamily Lamiinae. It was described by Wilhelm Ferdinand Erichson in 1847, and is known from Peru and Bolivia.
