= Apagomera aereiventris =

Scientific classification
- Domain: Eukaryota
- Kingdom: Animalia
- Phylum: Arthropoda
- Class: Insecta
- Order: Coleoptera
- Suborder: Polyphaga
- Infraorder: Cucujiformia
- Family: Cerambycidae
- Genus: Apagomera
- Species: A. aereiventris

Binomial name
- Apagomera aereiventris (Tippmann, 1960)

Synonyms
- Antodice aereiventris Tippmann, 1960

Species of beetle

Apagomera aereiventris is a species of beetle in the family Cerambycidae. It was described by Tippmann in 1960. It is known from Bolivia.
