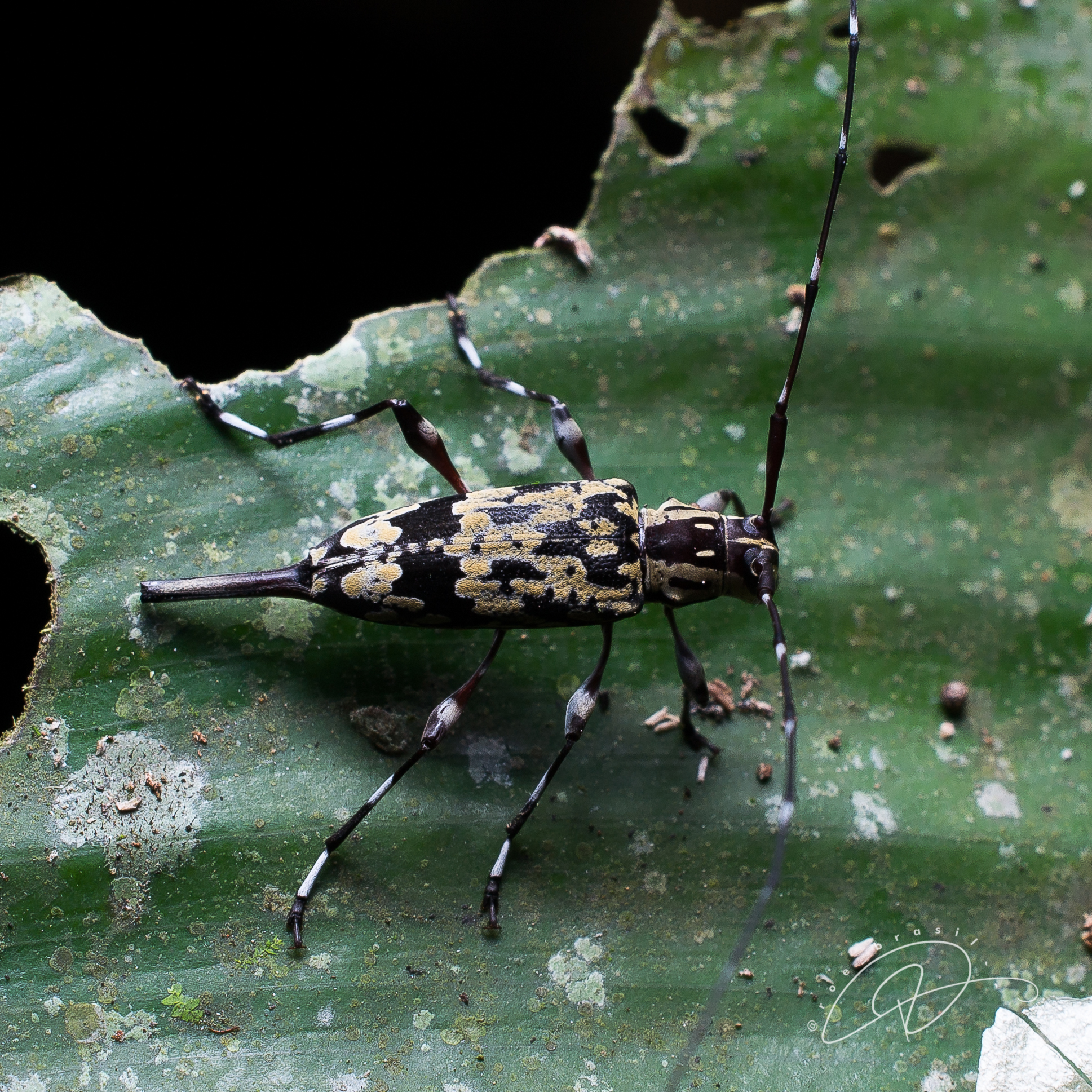

Scientific classification
- Domain: Eukaryota
- Kingdom: Animalia
- Phylum: Arthropoda
- Class: Insecta
- Order: Coleoptera
- Suborder: Polyphaga
- Infraorder: Cucujiformia
- Family: Cerambycidae
- Genus: Eutrypanus
- Species: E. tessellatus

Binomial name
- Eutrypanus tessellatus White, 1855

= Eutrypanus tessellatus =

Species of beetle

Eutrypanus tessellatus is a species of longhorn beetles of the subfamily Lamiinae. It was described by White in 1855, and is known from southeastern Brazil.
