= Rhinotragus trilineatus =

Scientific classification
- Kingdom: Animalia
- Phylum: Arthropoda
- Class: Insecta
- Order: Coleoptera
- Suborder: Polyphaga
- Infraorder: Cucujiformia
- Family: Cerambycidae
- Genus: Rhinotragus
- Species: R. trilineatus

Binomial name
- Rhinotragus trilineatus White, 1855

Species of beetle

Rhinotragus trilineatus is a species of beetle in the family Cerambycidae. It was described by White in 1855.
