= Rhinotragus sulphureus =

Scientific classification
- Kingdom: Animalia
- Phylum: Arthropoda
- Class: Insecta
- Order: Coleoptera
- Suborder: Polyphaga
- Infraorder: Cucujiformia
- Family: Cerambycidae
- Genus: Rhinotragus
- Species: R. sulphureus

Binomial name
- Rhinotragus sulphureus Giesbert, 1991

Species of beetle

Rhinotragus sulphureus is a species of beetle in the family Cerambycidae. It was described by Giesbert in 1991.
