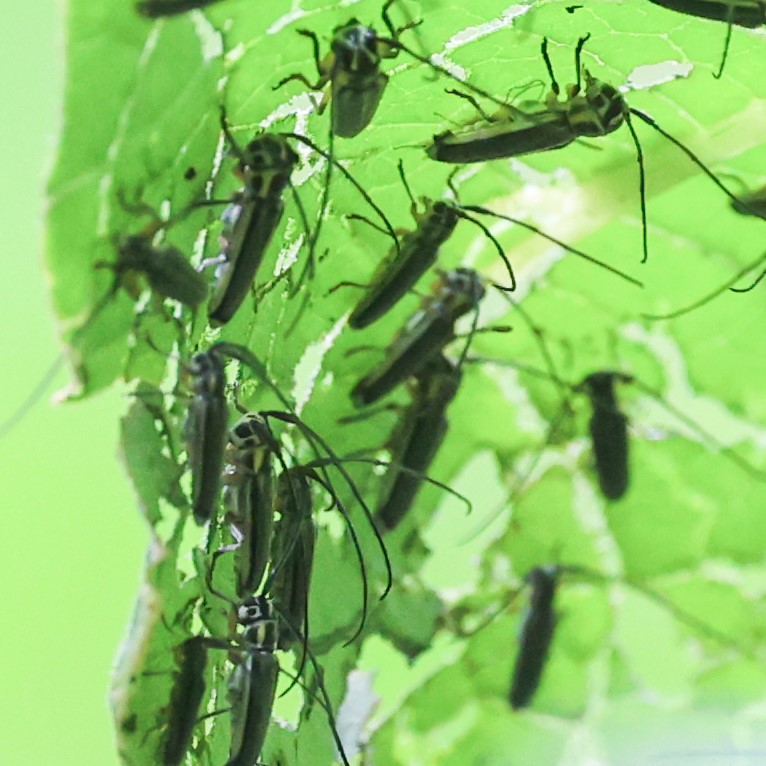

Scientific classification
- Kingdom: Animalia
- Phylum: Arthropoda
- Clade: Pancrustacea
- Class: Insecta
- Order: Coleoptera
- Suborder: Polyphaga
- Infraorder: Cucujiformia
- Family: Cerambycidae
- Genus: Pyrobolus
- Species: P. rectilineus

Binomial name
- Pyrobolus rectilineus (Bates, 1881)

Synonyms
- Cuiciuna rectilinea (Bates, 1881)

= Pyrobolus rectilineus =

Species of beetle

Pyrobolus rectilineus is a species of beetle in the family Cerambycidae. It was first described by Henry Walter Bates in 1881. It is known from Brazil.
