= Pyrobolus iuati =

Scientific classification
- Domain: Eukaryota
- Kingdom: Animalia
- Phylum: Arthropoda
- Class: Insecta
- Order: Coleoptera
- Suborder: Polyphaga
- Infraorder: Cucujiformia
- Family: Cerambycidae
- Genus: Pyrobolus
- Species: P. iuati

Binomial name
- Pyrobolus iuati Galileo & Martins, 1997

Synonyms
- Cuiciuna iuati Galileo & Martins, 1997

Species of beetle

Pyrobolus iuati is a species of beetle in the family Cerambycidae. It was described by Galileo and Martins in 1997. It is known from Brazil.
