= Pyrobolus melancholicus =

Scientific classification
- Kingdom: Animalia
- Phylum: Arthropoda
- Class: Insecta
- Order: Coleoptera
- Suborder: Polyphaga
- Infraorder: Cucujiformia
- Family: Cerambycidae
- Genus: Pyrobolus
- Species: P. melancholicus

Binomial name
- Pyrobolus melancholicus (Melzer, 1931)

Synonyms
- Cuiciuna melancholica (Melzer, 1931)

Species of beetle

Pyrobolus melancholicus is a species of beetle in the family Cerambycidae. It was described by Melzer in 1931. It is known from Brazil.
