= Pyrobolus amoenoides =

Scientific classification
- Domain: Eukaryota
- Kingdom: Animalia
- Phylum: Arthropoda
- Class: Insecta
- Order: Coleoptera
- Suborder: Polyphaga
- Infraorder: Cucujiformia
- Family: Cerambycidae
- Genus: Pyrobolus
- Species: P. amoenoides

Binomial name
- Pyrobolus amoenoides (Fisher, 1938)

Synonyms
- Cuiciuna amoenoides (Fisher, 1938)

Species of beetle

Pyrobolus amoenoides is a species of longhorn beetle in the family Cerambycidae. It was first described by Fisher in 1938. It is known from Brazil.
