= Ernst Friedrich Germar =

German entomologist (1786–1853)

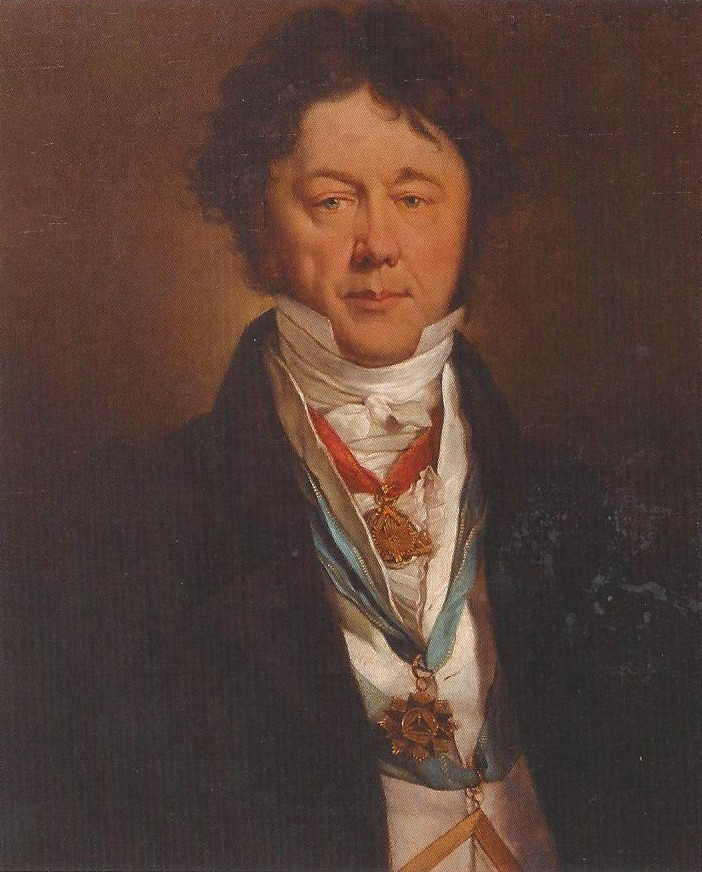
- Ernst Friedrich Germar
- Born: 3 November 1786; Glauchau, Electorate of Saxony
- Died: 8 July 1853 (aged 66); Halle (Saale), Kingdom of Prussia
- Occupations: Mineralogist, entomologist, professor
- Employer: University of Halle
- Known for: Contributions to entomology, mineralogy, and paleoentomology
- Spouse: Wilhelmine Keferstein
- Awards: Foreign member of the Royal Swedish Academy of Sciences

Ernst Friedrich Germar (3 November 1786 – 8 July 1853) was a German professor and director of the Mineralogical Museum at Halle. As well as being a mineralogist he was interested in entomology and particularly in the Coleoptera and Hemiptera. He wrote monographs on several insect families including the Scutelleridae. He also took an interest in paleoentomology.

== Life and work ==
Germar was born in Glauchau in the Electorate of Saxony where his father was a merchant. His two older and a younger brother went to study trade but Ernst went to a grammar school in Meiningen at the age of twelve under the care of Schaubach, a relative of his father. He became interested in insects thanks to a friend who had attended forestry classes at Dreissigacker under Johann Matthäus Bechstein. He also got to know the entomologist Joseph Philippe de Clairville who lived in Meiningen. In 1804 he went to study at the mining academy (Bergakademie) at Freiburg where he was influenced by Abraham Gottlob Werner. After his mining education, he went to Leipzig in 1807 to study law and also attended lectures in natural sciences. He also began to purchase insect specimens including those of Fabricius from Hubner in Halle at a great cost of 400 thalers. He also met Gustav Kunze and Curt Sprengel. He studied under Sprengel and wrote a thesis Dissertatio sistens bombycum spesies, secundum oris partium diversitatem in nova genera distributas in 1810 for his doctorate. In 1811 he travelled to Dalmatia making collections and in 1812 he defended a second doctorate and joined as a director for the mineral cabinet at Halle. 1817 he visited the museum in Vienna where he met Megerle von Mühlfeld. He was appointed as an extraordinary to the university and was involved in teaching entomology and paleontology. In 1819 he published a textbook of mineralogy. He was appointed rector in 1834-35 and received an honorary degree in medicine and in 1844 he was titled Hofrat.

Germar married Wilhelmine Keferstein (1755-1816) in 1815. Wilhemine's brother Christian and Adolf became interested in zoology and butterflies through the influence of Germar. In 1845, he was elected a foreign member of the Royal Swedish Academy of Sciences. A number of taxa were named in his honour including Germaria Robineau-Desvoidy, 1830; Germaria Laporte, 1832; Pseudogermaria Brauer & Bergenstamm, 1891; Paragermaria Townsend, 1909; Germariella Champion, 1911; Germariopsis Townsend, 1915; Germariochaeta Villeneuve, 1937; Germaropyge Snajdr, 1957; Germarina Mesnil, 1963; Germaraphis Heie, 1967; and Germaria Jeanne, 1972.

== Published works ==
Amongst Germar's publications are:

- Species Cicadarium enumeratae et sub genera distributae. Thon's Entomologisches Archiv. (2)2: 37–57, pl. 1 (1830).
- Observations sur plusieurs espèces du genre Cicada, Latr. Rev. Entomol. Silbermann 2: 49–82, pls. 19-26 (1834).
- Ueber die Elateriden mit häutigen Anhängen der Tarsenglieder. Z. Entomol. (Germar) 1: 193-236 (1839) (1839).
- Bemerkungen über Elateriden. Z. Entomol. (Breslau) 5: 133-192 (1844).
- Beiträge zur insektenfauna von Adelaide. Linn. Entomol. 3: 153-247 (1848).
- Fauna Insectorum Europae. There were 24 fascicles in this work; August Ahrens producing the first two, Germar and Georg Friedrich Kaulfuss the third (1817) and Germar alone the remaining 21.

He was also editor of the entomological journal Zeitschrift für die Entomologie, which was published from 1839 to 1844.

== Collections ==
His collections are held at the Deutsches Entomologisches Institut (DEI).

== Other sources ==
- Groll, E. K. (Hrsg.): Biografien der Entomologen der Welt : Datenbank. Version 4.15 : Senckenberg Deutsches Entomologisches Institut, 2010
- Gaedike, R.; Groll, E. K. & Taeger, A. 2012: Bibliography of the entomological literature from the beginning until 1863 : online database - version 1.0 - Senckenberg Deutsches Entomologisches Institut. Full list of Germar's publications.
- Biography
