= Coleoptera in the 10th edition of Systema Naturae =

Class of insects in Linnaeus' System Natura

In the 10th edition of Systema Naturae, Carl Linnaeus classified the arthropods, including insects, arachnids and crustaceans, among his class "Insecta". Insects with hardened wing covers (beetles, earwigs and orthopteroid insects) were brought together under the name Coleoptera.

== Scarabaeus (scarab beetles) ==
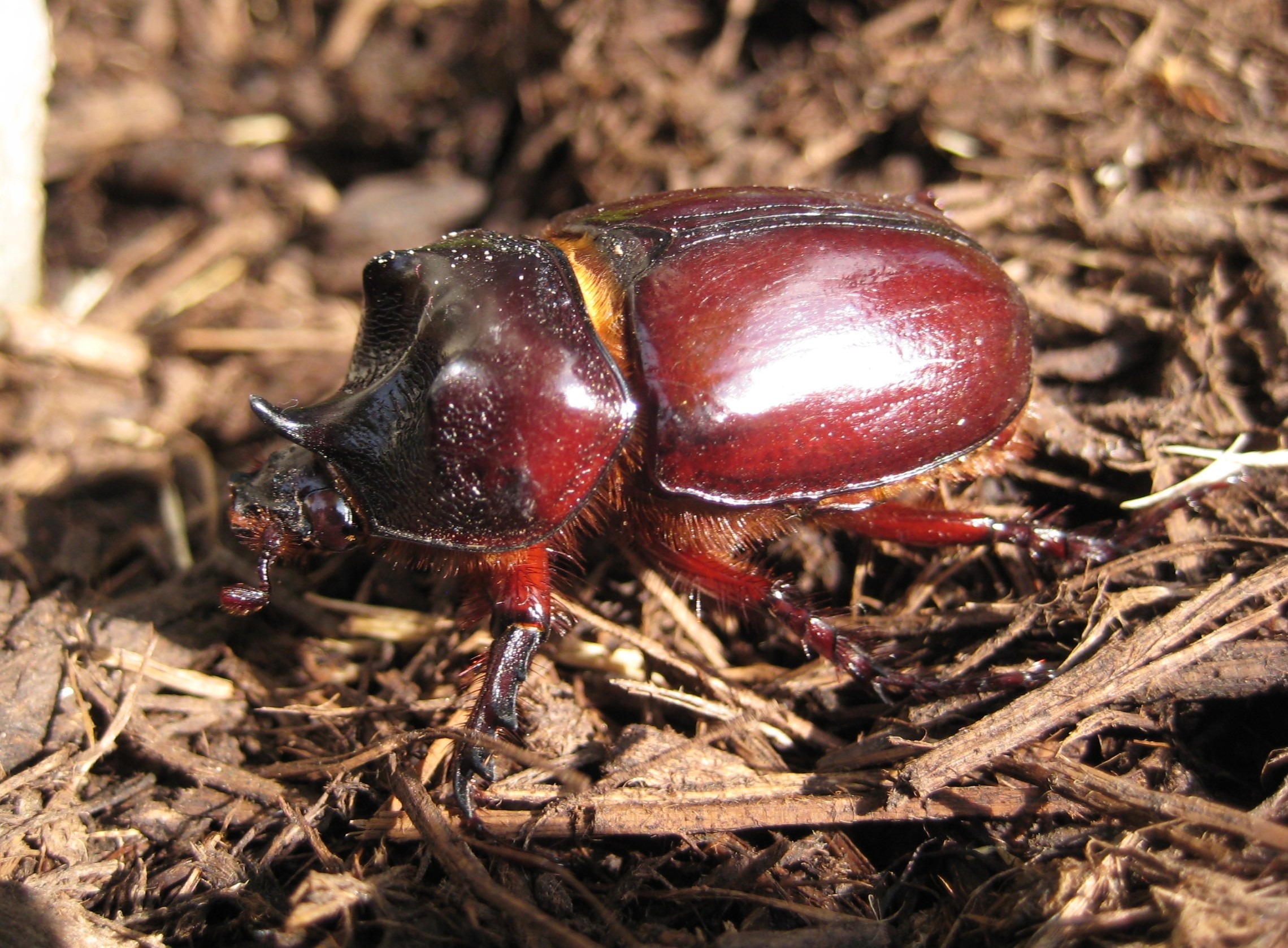
Strategus aloeus was named Scarabaeus aloeus in 1758.

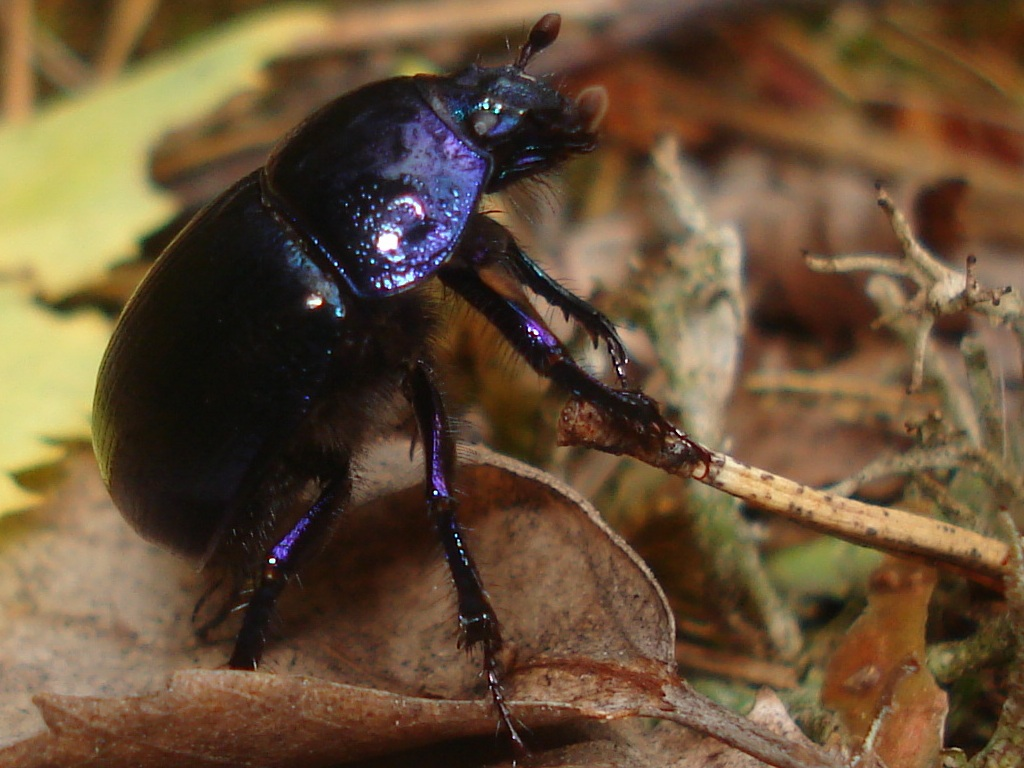
Geotrupes stercorarius was named Scarabaeus stercorarius in 1758.

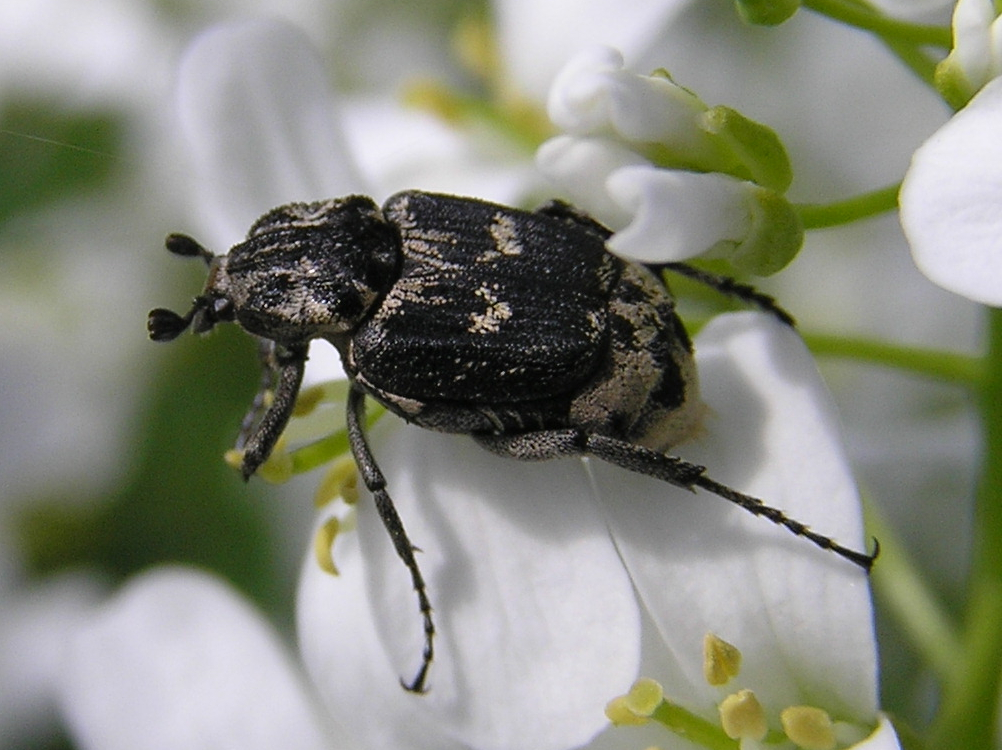
Valgus hemipterus was named Scarabaeus hemipterus in 1758.

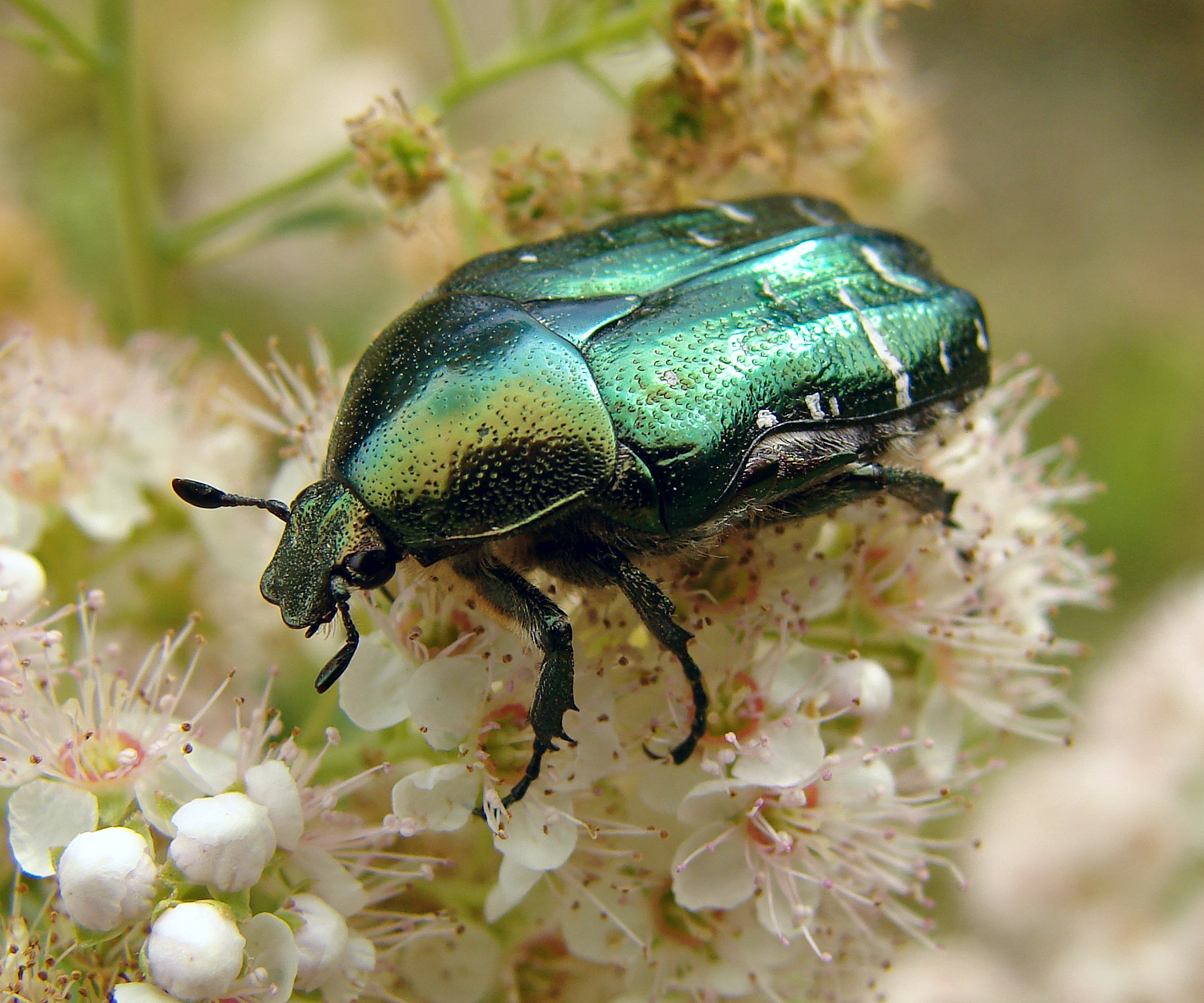
Cetonia aurata was named Scarabaeus auratus in 1758.

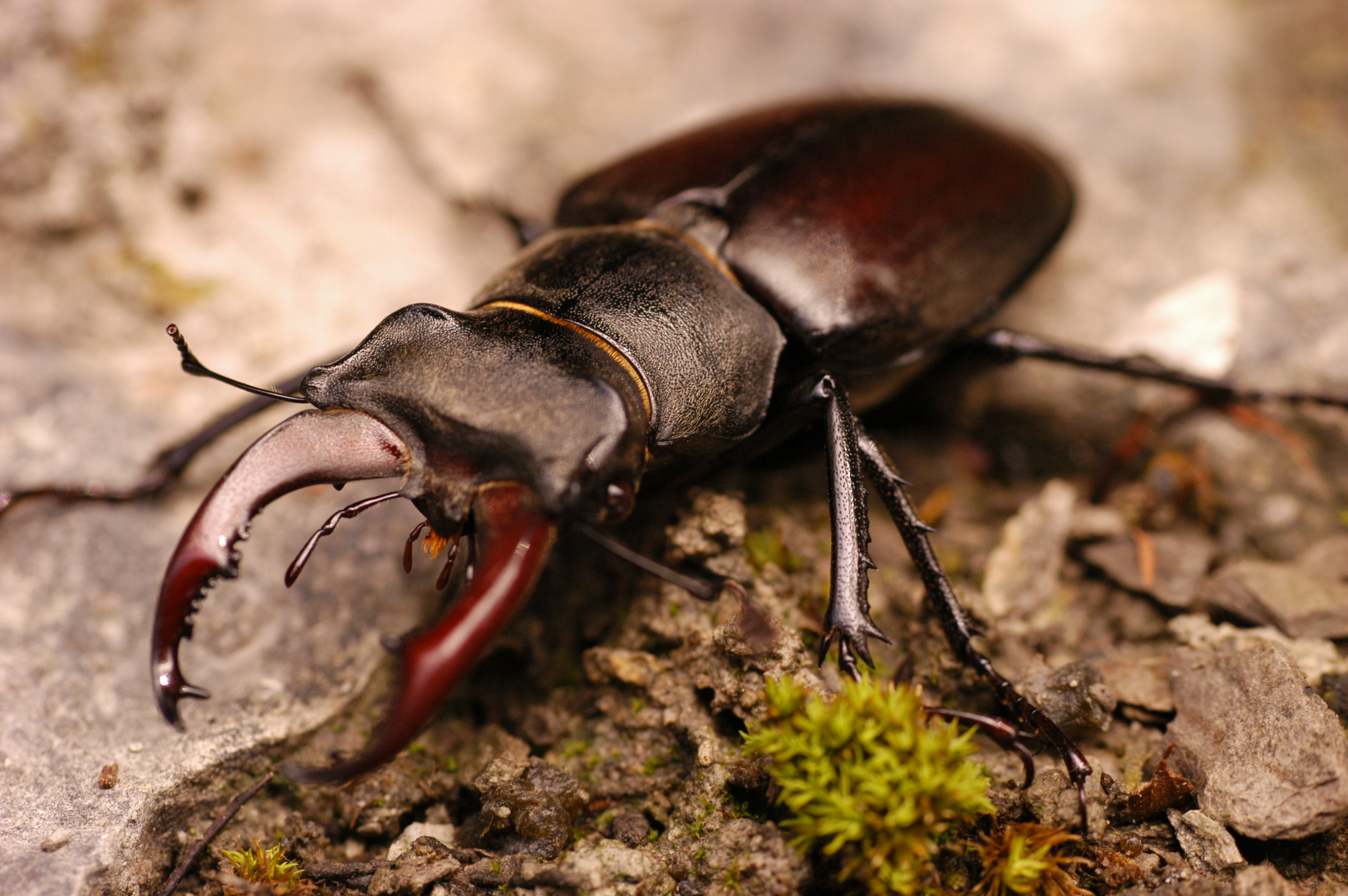
Lucanus cervus was named Scarabaeus cervus in 1758.

- Scarabaeus hercules – male of Dynastes hercules
- Scarabaeus actaeon – Megasoma actaeon
- Scarabaeus simson – Strategus simson
- Scarabaeus atlas – Chalcosoma atlas
- Scarabaeus aloëus – Strategus aloeus
- Scarabaeus typhoeus – Typhaeus typhoeus
- Scarabaeus nasicornis – Oryctes nasicornis
- Scarabaeus lunaris – Copris lunaris
- Scarabaeus cylindricus – Sinodendron cylindricum
- Scarabaeus carnifex – Phanaeus carnifex
- Scarabaeus rhinoceros – Oryctes rhinoceros
- Scarabaeus molossus – Catharsius molossus
- Scarabaeus mimas – Diabroctis mimas
- Scarabaeus sacer – Scarabaeus sacer
- Scarabaeus didymus – Phileurus didymus
- Scarabaeus valgus – Phileurus valgus
- Scarabaeus nuchicornis – Onthophagus nuchicornis
- Scarabaeus subterraneus – Eupleurus subterraneus
- Scarabaeus erraticus – Colobopterus erraticus
- Scarabaeus maurus – Glaphyrus maurus
- Scarabaeus fossor – Teuchestes fossor
- Scarabaeus fimetarius – Aphodius fimetarius
- Scarabaeus haemorrhoidalis – Aphodius haemorrhoidalis
- Scarabaeus conspurcatus – Chilothorax conspurcatus
- Scarabaeus gigas – Heliocopris gigas
- Scarabaeus scaber – female of Dynastes hercules
- Scarabaeus longimanus – Euchirus longimanus
- Scarabaeus pilularius – Canthon pilularius
- Scarabaeus schaefferi – Sisyphus schaefferi
- Scarabaeus stercorarius – Geotrupes stercorarius
- Scarabaeus vernalis – Trypocopris vernalis
- Scarabaeus calcaratus
- Scarabaeus fabulosus
- Scarabaeus chrysis – Macraspis chrysis
- Scarabaeus nitidus – Cotinis nitida
- Scarabaeus lanigerus – Cotalpa lanigera
- Scarabaeus festivus – Oxysternon festivum
- Scarabaeus lineola – Rutela lineola
- Scarabaeus punctatus – Pelidnota punctata
- Scarabaeus sepicola
- Scarabaeus syriacus – Pygopleurus syriacus
- Scarabaeus horticola – Phyllopertha horticola
- Scarabaeus melolontha – Melolontha melolontha
- Scarabaeus solstitialis – Amphimallon solstitialis
- Scarabaeus hemipterus – Valgus hemipterus
- Scarabaeus fullo – Polyphylla fullo
- Scarabaeus fasciatus – Trichius fasciatus
- Scarabaeus indus – Euphoria inda
- Scarabaeus brunnus – Serica brunnea
- Scarabaeus capensis – Trichostetha capensis
- Scarabaeus lanius – Gymnetis lanius
- Scarabaeus auratus – Cetonia aurata
- Scarabaeus variabilis – Gnorimus variabilis
- Scarabaeus nobilis – Gnorimus nobilis
- Scarabaeus rufipes – Acrossus rufipes
- Scarabaeus aquaticus – Hydrobius fuscipes
- Scarabaeus ceratoniae – Sinoxylon ceratoniae
- Scarabaeus cervus – Lucanus cervus
- Scarabaeus interruptus – Passalus interruptus
- Scarabaeus carinatus – Chalcodes carinatus
- Scarabaeus tridentatus – artificial chimaera, comprising the head of Lucanus cervus on the body of Prionus coriarius
- Scarabaeus parallelipipedus – Dorcus parallelipipedus
- Scarabaeus caraboides – Platycerus caraboides

== Dermestes (larder beetles) ==
- Dermestes lardarius – Dermestes lardarius
- Dermestes undatus – Megatoma undata
- Dermestes pellio – Attagenus pellio, the carpet beetle
- Dermestes pectinicornis – Ptilinus pectinicornis
- Dermestes clavicornis – Orthocerus clavicornis
- Dermestes pertinax – Hadrobregmus pertinax
- Dermestes mollis – Ernobius mollis
- Dermestes capucinus – Bostrichus capucinus
- Dermestes typographus – Ips typographus
- Dermestes micrographus – Pityophthorus micrographus
- Dermestes poligraphus – Polygraphus poligraphus
- Dermestes piniperda – Tomicus piniperda
- Dermestes violaceus – Necrobia violacea
- Dermestes fenestralis – Rhizophagus fenestralis
- Dermestes domesticus – Trypodendron domesticum
- Dermestes melanocephalus – Cercyon melanocephalus
- Dermestes murinus – Dermestes murinus
- Dermestes pilula – Byrrhus pilula
- Dermestes scarabaeoides – Sphaeridium scarabaeoides
- Dermestes scrophulariae – Anthrenus scrophulariae
- Dermestes pisorum – Bruchus pisorum
- Dermestes paniceus – Stegobium paniceum
- Dermestes eustatius
- Dermestes stercoreus – Typhaea stercorea
- Dermestes pedicularius – Kateretes pedicularius
- Dermestes pulicarius – Brachypterolus pulicarius
- Dermestes psyllius
- Dermestes scanicus – Cryptophagus scanicus
- Dermestes colon
- Dermestes surinamensis – Oryzaephilus surinamensis
- Dermestes hemipterus – Carpophilus hemipterus

== Hister (clown beetles) ==
- Hister unicolor – Hister unicolor
- Hister pygmaeus – Dendrophilus pygmaeus
- Hister bimaculatus – Atholus bimaculatus
- Hister quadrimaculatus – Hister quadrimaculatus

== Silpha (carrion beetles) ==
- Silpha germanica – Nicrophorus germanicus
- Silpha vespillo – Nicrophorus vespillo
- Silpha bipunctata – Nitidula bipunctata
- Silpha quadripunctata – Glischrochilus quadripunctatus
- Silpha indica
- Silpha americana – Necrophila americana, the American carrion beetle
- Silpha seminulum – Agathidium seminulum
- Silpha agaricina – Scaphisoma agaricinum
- Silpha maura
- Silpha russica – Triplax russica
- Silpha littoralis – Necrodes littoralis
- Silpha atrata – Phosphuga atrata
- Silpha thoracica – Oiceoptoma thoracicum
- Silpha opaca – Aclypea opaca
- Silpha rugosa – Thanatophilus rugosus
- Silpha sabulosa – Opatrum sabulosum
- Silpha obscura – Silpha obscura
- Silpha ferruginea – Ostoma ferrugineum
- Silpha grossa – Peltis grossa
- Silpha oblonga – Grynocharis oblonga
- Silpha aquatica – Helophorus aquaticus
- Silpha colon – Omosita colon
- Silpha depressa – Omosita depressa
- Silpha grisea – Soronia grisea
- Silpha aestiva – Epuraea aestiva
- Silpha pedicularis

== Cassida (tortoise beetles) ==
- Cassida viridis – Cassida viridis
- Cassida nebulosa – Cassida nebulosa
- Cassida nobilis – Cassida nobilis
- Cassida cruciata – Deloyala cruciata
- Cassida bifasciata – Charidotella bifasciata
- Cassida flava – Paraselenis flava
- Cassida purpurea – Charidotella purpurea
- Cassida marginata – Chelymorpha marginata
- Cassida reticularis – Stolas reticularis
- Cassida variegata – Discomorpha variegata
- Cassida grossa – Eugenysa grossa
- Cassida clatrata – Omaspides clathrata
- Cassida jamaicensis – Eurypepla jamaicensis
- Cassida cyanea – Cyrtonota cyanea
- Cassida inaequalis – Stolas inaequalis
- Cassida lateralis – Cyrtonota lateralis
- Cassida discoides – Stolas discoides
- Cassida petiveriana – Therea petiveriana

== Coccinella (ladybirds or ladybugs) ==
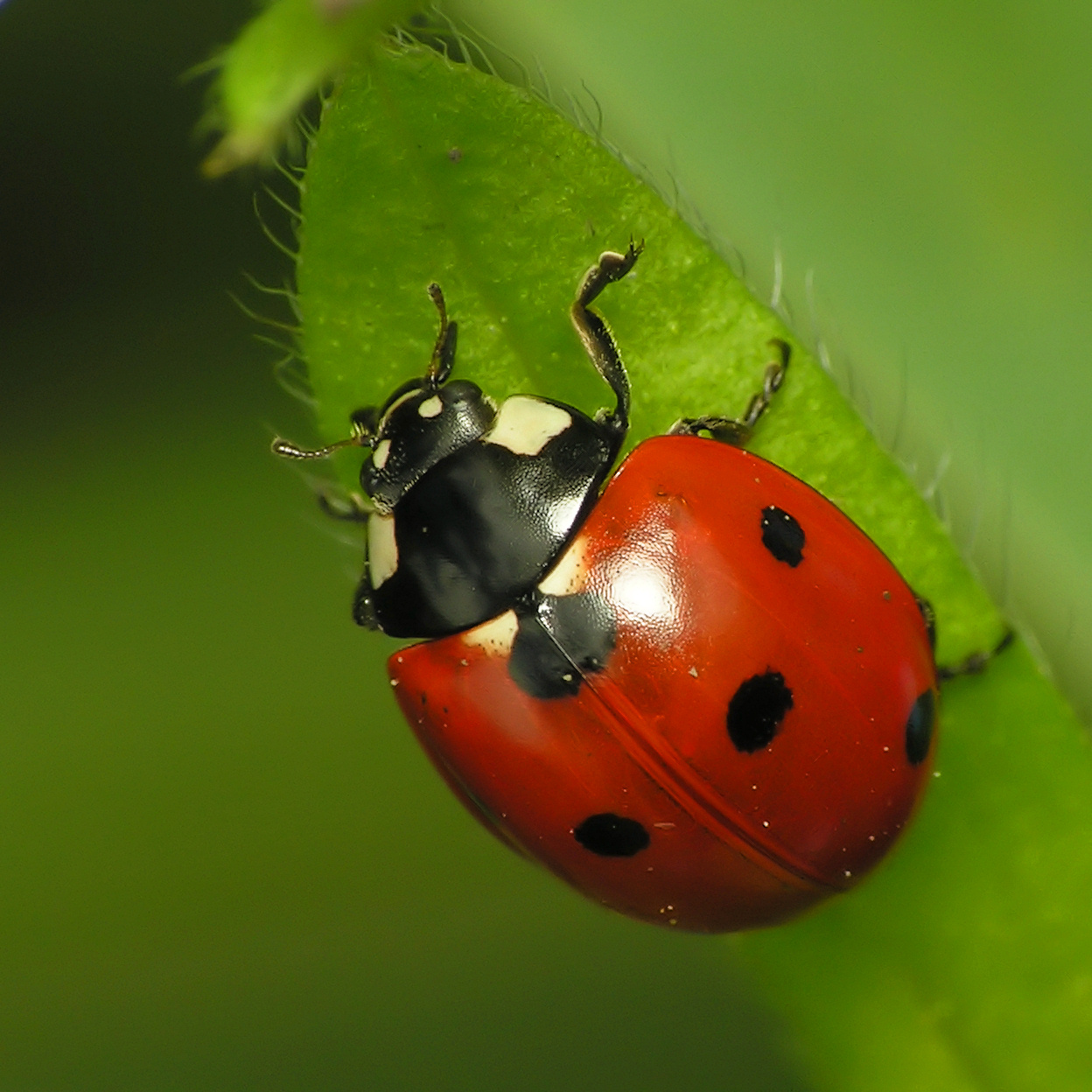
Coccinella septempunctata was named Coccinella 7-punctata in 1758.

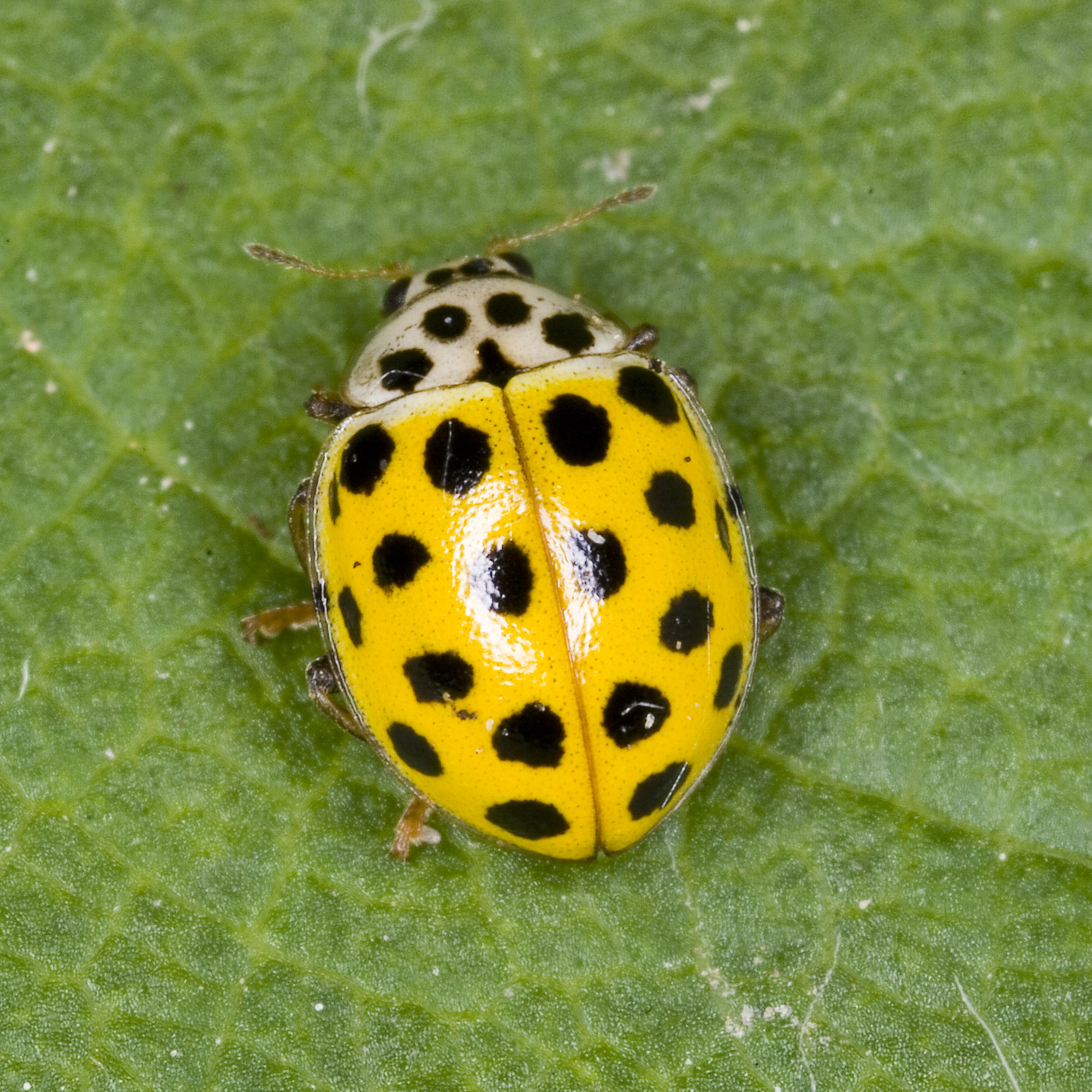
Psyllobora vigintiduopunctata was named Coccinella 22-punctata in 1758.

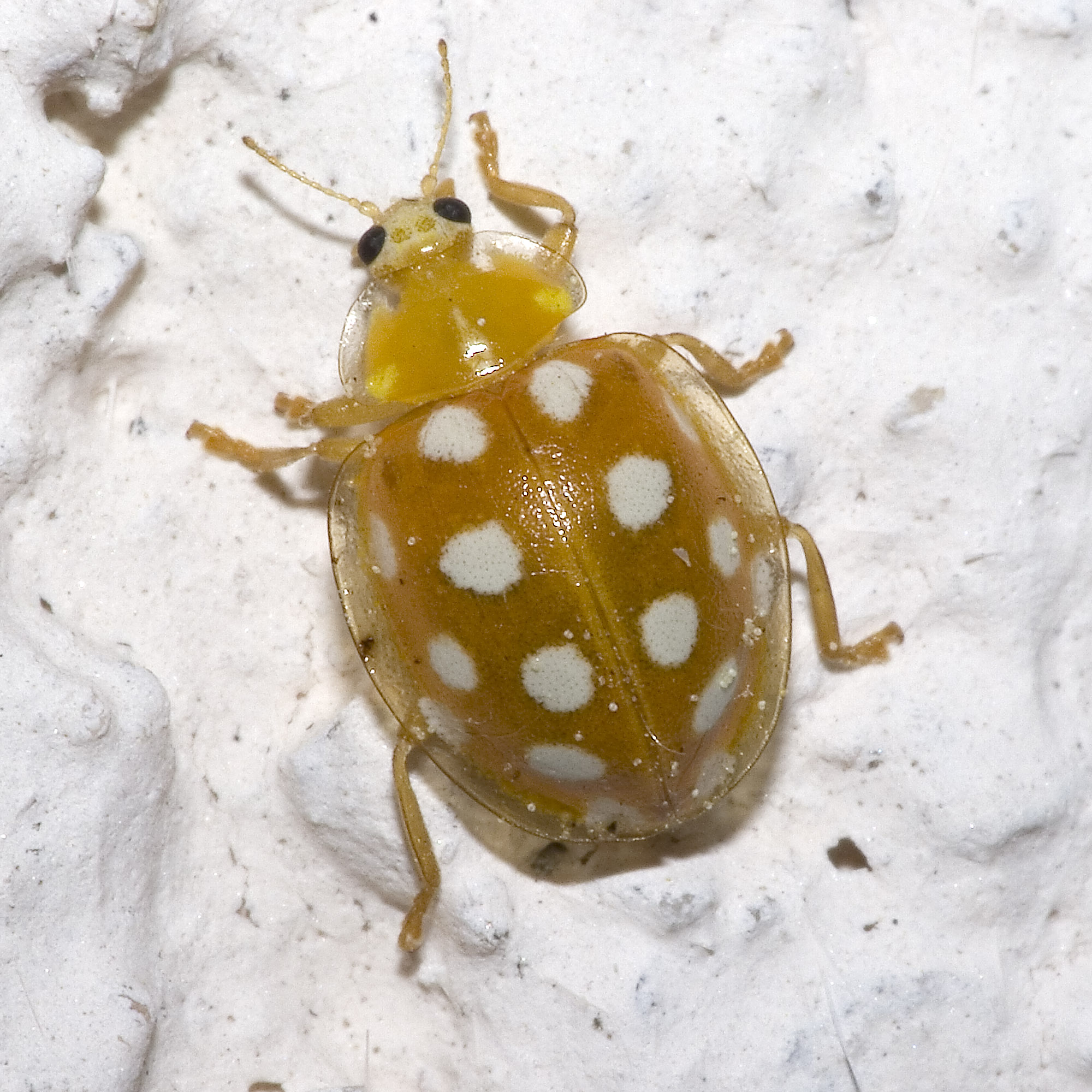
Halyzia sedecimguttata was named Coccinella 16-guttata in 1758.

- Coccinella unipunctata – Cercyon unipunctatus
- Coccinella 2-punctata – Adalia bipunctata
- Coccinella 3-punctata – Coccinella undecimpunctata tripunctata
- Coccinella hebraea – Anatis ocellata
- Coccinella 5-punctata – Coccinella quinquepunctata
- Coccinella trifasciata – Coccinella trifasciata
- Coccinella hieroglyphica – Coccinella hieroglyphica
- Coccinella 7-punctata – Coccinella septempunctata
- Coccinella 9-punctata – Coccinella undecimpunctata
- Coccinella 10-punctata – Adalia decempunctata
- Coccinella 11-punctata – Coccinella undecimpunctata
- Coccinella 13-punctata – Hippodamia tredecimpunctata
- Coccinella 14-punctata – Propylea quatuordecimpunctata
- Coccinella ocellata – Anatis ocellata
- Coccinella 19-punctata – Anisosticta novemdecimpunctata
- Coccinella 22-punctata – Psyllobora vigintiduopunctata
- Coccinella 24-punctata – Subcoccinella vigintiquatuorpunctata
- Coccinella 25-punctata – Subcoccinella vigintiquatuorpunctata
- Coccinella conglobata – Oenopia conglobata
- Coccinella conglomerata – Adalia conglomerata
- Coccinella guttatopunctata – Adalia decempunctata
- Coccinella 14-guttata – Calvia quatuordecimguttata
- Coccinella 16-guttata – Halyzia sedecimguttata
- Coccinella 18-guttata – Myrrha octodecimguttata
- Coccinella 20-guttata – Sospita vigintiguttata
- Coccinella oblongoguttata – Myzia oblongoguttata
- Coccinella obliterata – Aphidecta obliterata
- Coccinella 2-pustulata – Chilocorus bipustulatus
- Coccinella 4-pustulata – Exochomus quadripustulatus
- Coccinella 6-pustulata – Adalia bipunctata
- Coccinella 10-pustulata – Adalia decempunctata
- Coccinella 14-pustulata – Coccinula quatuordecimpustulata
- Coccinella 16-pustulata
- Coccinella gigantea
- Coccinella pantherina – Adalia bipunctata
- Coccinella tigrina – Sospita vigintiguttata

== Chrysomela (leaf beetles) ==
- Chrysomela göttingensis – Timarcha goettingensis
- Chrysomela tanaceti – Galeruca tanaceti
- Chrysomela haemorrhoidalis
- Chrysomela graminis – Chrysolina graminis, the tansy beetle
- Chrysomela aenea – Plagiosterna aenea
- Chrysomela alni – Agelastica alni
- Chrysomela betulae
- Chrysomela haemoptera – Chrysolina haemoptera
- Chrysomela occidentalis – Colaspis occidentalis
- Chrysomela padi – Cyphon padi
- Chrysomela armoraciae – Phaedon armoraciae
- Chrysomela hypochaeridis – Cryptocephalus hypochaeridis
- Chrysomela vulgatissima – Phratora vulgatissima, the blue willow beetle
- Chrysomela vitellinae – Phratora vitellinae
- Chrysomela polygoni – Gastrophysa polygoni
- Chrysomela pallida – Gonioctena pallida
- Chrysomela staphylaea – Chrysolina staphylaea
- Chrysomela polita – Chrysolina polita
- Chrysomela clavicornis – Aegithus clavicornis
- Chrysomela populi – Chrysomela populi
- Chrysomela viminalis – Gonioctena viminalis
- Chrysomela 10-punctata
- Chrysomela lapponica – Chrysomela lapponica
- Chrysomela boleti – Diaperis boleti
- Chrysomela collaris – Chrysomela collaris
- Chrysomela sanguinolenta – Chrysolina sanguinolenta
- Chrysomela marginata – Chrysolina marginata
- Chrysomela marginella – Hydrothassa marginella
- Chrysomela aestuans – Platyphora aestuans
- Chrysomela coccinea – Endomychus coccineus
- Chrysomela philadelphica – Calligrapha philadelphica
- Chrysomela americana – Chrysolina americana
- Chrysomela sacra – Entomoscelis sacra
- Chrysomela minuta – Laccobius minutus
- Chrysomela oleracea – Altica oleracea
- Chrysomela chrysocephala – Psylliodes chrysocephala
- Chrysomela hyoscyami – Psylliodes hyoscyami
- Chrysomela erythrocephala – synonym of Psylliodes chrysocephala
- Chrysomela helxines
- Chrysomela exsoleta – Longitarsus exsoletus
- Chrysomela nitidula – Crepidodera nitidula
- Chrysomela nemorum – Phyllotreta nemorum
- Chrysomela rufipes – Derocrepis rufipes
- Chrysomela holsatica – Longitarsus holsaticus
- Chrysomela hemisphaerica
- Chrysomela surinamensis
- Chrysomela s-litera – Systena s-littera
- Chrysomela aequinoctialis – Omophoita aequinoctialis
- Chrysomela tridentata – Labidostomis tridentata
- Chrysomela 4-punctata – Clytra quadripunctata
- Chrysomela 2-punctata – Cryptocephalus bipunctatus
- Chrysomela moraei – Cryptocephalus moraei
- Chrysomela nitida – Cryptocephalus nitidus
- Chrysomela sericea – Cryptocephalus sericeus
- Chrysomela coryli – Cryptocephalus coryli
- Chrysomela pini – Cryptocephalus pini
- Chrysomela bothnica – Cryptocephalus decemmaculatus
- Chrysomela cordigera – Cryptocephalus cordiger
- Chrysomela 6-punctata – Cryptocephalus sexpunctatus
- Chrysomela 10-maculata – Cryptocephalus decemmaculatus
- Chrysomela obscura – Bromius obscurus
- Chrysomela merdigera – Lilioceris merdigera
- Chrysomela nymphaeae – Galerucella nymphaeae
- Chrysomela caprea – Lochmaea caprea
- Chrysomela 4-maculata – Phyllobrotica quadrimaculata
- Chrysomela cyanella – Lema cyanella
- Chrysomela 12-punctata – Crioceris duodecimpunctata
- Chrysomela melanopus – Oulema melanopus, the cereal leaf beetle
- Chrysomela phellandrii – Prasocuris phellandrii
- Chrysomela asparagi – Crioceris asparagi
- Chrysomela cerasi – Orsodacne cerasi
- Chrysomela sulphurea – Cteniopus sulphureus
- Chrysomela cervina – Dascillus cervinus
- Chrysomela ceramboides – Pseudocistela ceramboides
- Chrysomela murina – Isomira murina
- Chrysomela hirta – Lagria hirta
- Chrysomela inda
- Chrysomela elongata – Tillus elongatus

== Curculio (true weevils) ==
- Curculio palmarum – Rhynchophorus palmarum
- Curculio indus
- Curculio hemipterus – Metamasius hemipterus
- Curculio violaceus – Magdalis violacea
- Curculio alliariae
- Curculio cyaneus – Orobitis cyanea
- Curculio aterrimus
- Curculio cerasi – Magdalis cerasi
- Curculio acridulus – Notaris acridulus
- Curculio purpureus
- Curculio frumentarius – Apion frumentarium
- Curculio granarius – Sitophilus granarius
- Curculio dorsalis – Dorytomus dorsalis
- Curculio melanocardius – Rhodobaenus melanocardius
- Curculio pini – Pissodes pini
- Curculio rumicis – Hypera rumicis
- Curculio lapathi – Cryptorhynchus lapathi
- Curculio cupreus – Involvulus cupreus
- Curculio scaber – Otiorhynchus scaber
- Curculio T-album – Limnobaris t-album
- Curculio quercus – Orchestes quercus
- Curculio arator – Hypera arator
- Curculio 2-punctatus – Ellescus bipunctatus
- Curculio 4-maculatus – Nedyus quadrimaculatus
- Curculio 5-maculatus
- Curculio pericarpius – Rhinoncus pericarpius
- Curculio scrophulariae – Cionus scrophulariae
- Curculio vittatus – Exophthalmus vittatus
- Curculio paraplecticus – Lixus paraplecticus
- Curculio algirus – Lixomorphus algirus
- Curculio bacchus – Rhynchites bacchus
- Curculio betulae – Byctiscus betulae
- Curculio populi – Byctiscus populi
- Curculio alni – Orchestes alni
- Curculio salicis – Tachyerges salicis
- Curculio fagi – Orchestes fagi
- Curculio segetis – Orchestes pilosus
- Curculio pomorum – Anthonomus pomorum
- Curculio ovatus – Otiorhynchus ovatus
- Curculio carbonarius – Magdalis carbonaria
- Curculio mucoreus
- Curculio pusio
- Curculio vaginalis – Cratosomus vaginalis
- Curculio stigma – Rhinochenus stigma
- Curculio depressus – Homalinotus depressus
- Curculio annulatus – Cholus annulatus
- Curculio dispar – Estenorhinus dispar
- Curculio anchorago – Brentus anchorago
- Curculio abietis – Hylobius abietis, the pine weevil
- Curculio germanus – Liparus germanus
- Curculio nucum – Curculio nucum
- Curculio 5-punctatus – Tychius quinquepunctatus
- Curculio hispidus – Trachodes hispidus
- Curculio rectirostris – Anthonomus rectirostris
- Curculio pedicularius – Anthonomus pedicularius
- Curculio ligustici – Otiorhynchus ligustici
- Curculio pyri – Phyllobius pyri
- Curculio oblongus – Phyllobius oblongus
- Curculio argentatus – Phyllobius argentatus
- Curculio ovatus – Otiorhynchus ovatus
- Curculio cervinus – Polydrusus cervinus
- Curculio argyreus – Compsus argyreus
- Curculio viridis – Chlorophanus viridis
- Curculio speciosus – Rhigus speciosus
- Curculio ruficornis – Magdalis ruficornis
- Curculio albinus – Platystomos albinus
- Curculio lineatus – Sitona lineatus
- Curculio incanus – Brachyderes incanus
- Curculio cloropus – Phyllobius viridicollis
- Curculio rufipes
- Curculio nebulosus – Coniocleonus nebulosus
- Curculio ater – Rhyncolus ater
- Curculio emeritus
- Curculio barbarus – Brachycerus barbarus
- Curculio cornutus
- Curculio 16-punctatus – Ericydeus sedecimpunctatus
- Curculio granulatus – Entimus granulatus
- Curculio abbreviatus – Diaprepes abbreviatus
- Curculio chinensis – Callosobruchus chinensis
- Curculio apterus – Brachycerus apterus

== Attelabus (leaf-rolling weevils) ==
- Attelabus coryli – Apoderus coryli
- Attelabus surinamensis
- Attelabus pensylvanicus
- Attelabus betulae – Deporaus betulae
- Attelabus formicarius – Thanasimus formicarius
- Attelabus sipylus – Trichodes sipylus
- Attelabus apiarius – Trichodes apiarius
- Attelabus mollis – Opilo mollis
- Attelabus ceramboides – Upis ceramboides
- Attelabus buprestoides – Spondylis buprestoides

== Cerambyx (longhorn beetles) ==
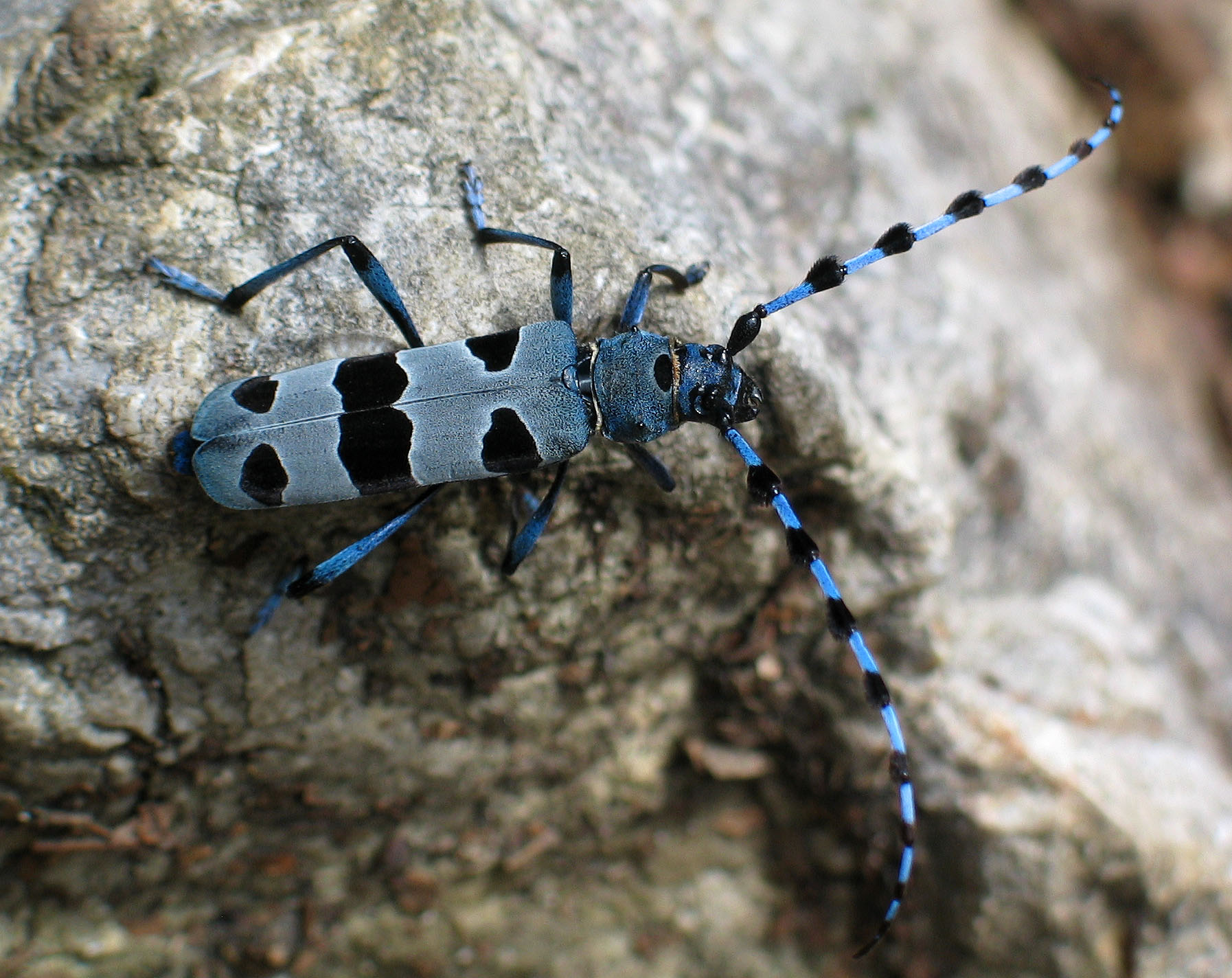
Rosalia alpina was named Cerambyx alpinus in 1758.

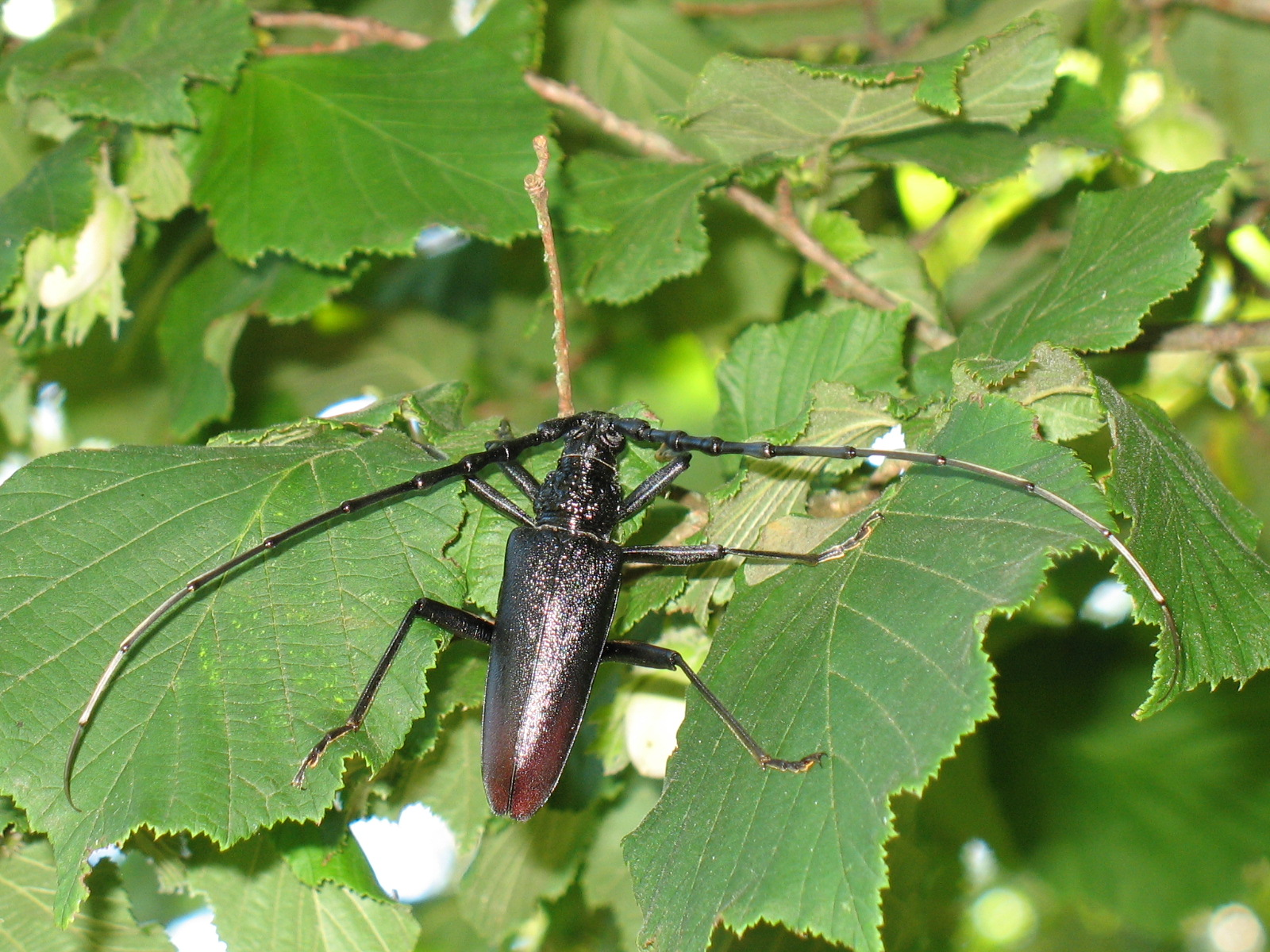
Cerambyx cerdo was named in 1758.

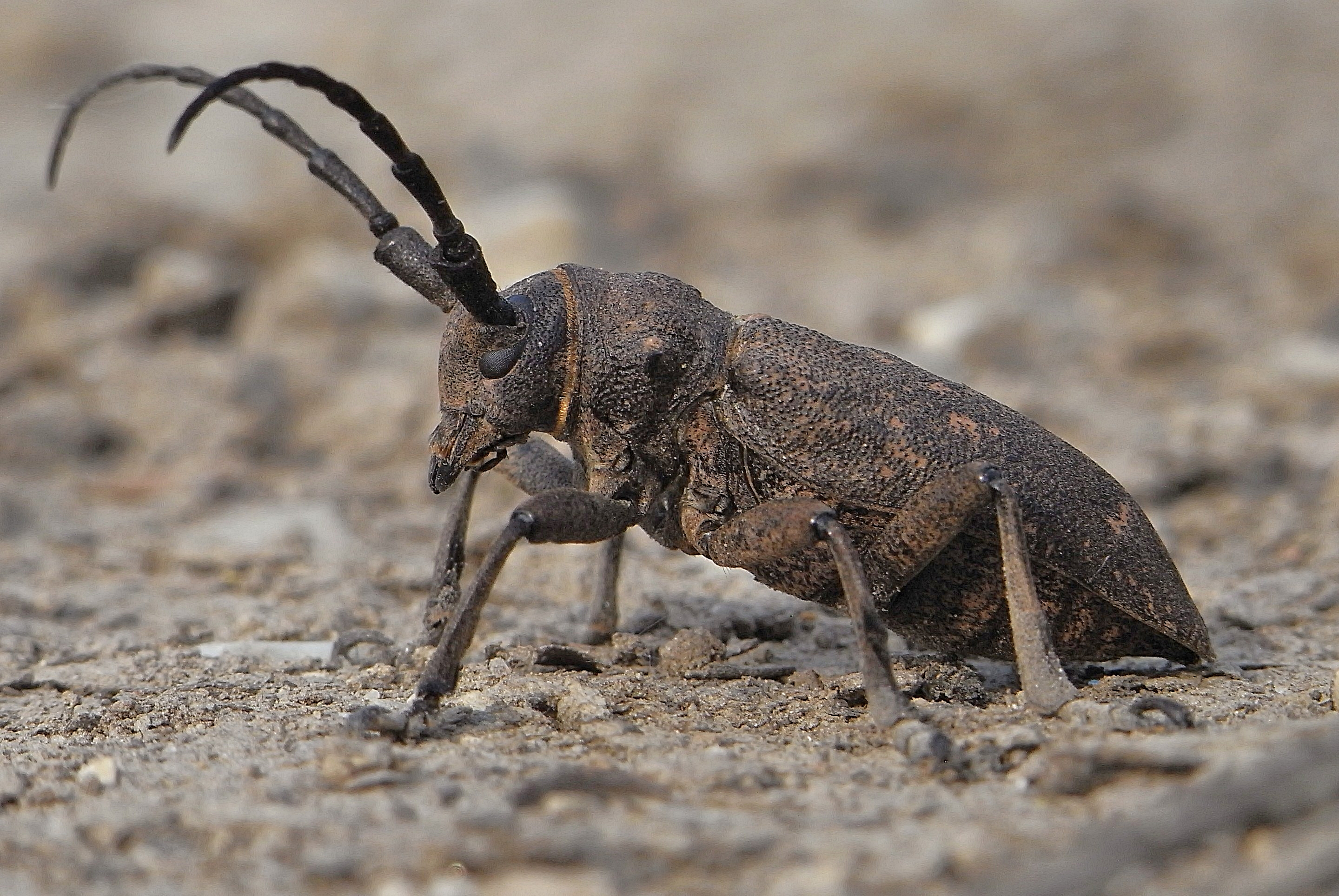
Lamia textor was named Cerambyx textor in 1758.

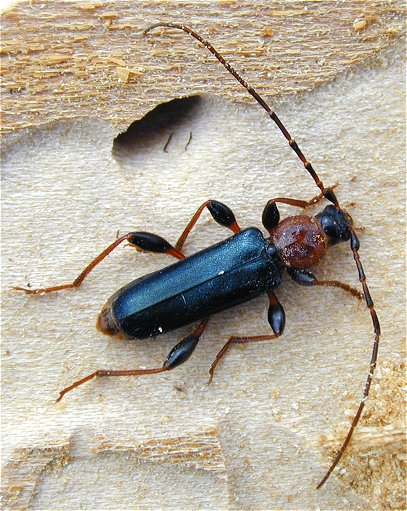
Phymatodes testaceus was named Cerambyx testaceus in 1758.

- Cerambyx longimanus – Acrocinus longimanus
- Cerambyx trochlearis – Macropophora trochlearis
- Cerambyx cervicornis – Macrodontia cervicornis
- Cerambyx coriarius – Prionus coriarius
- Cerambyx cinnamomeus – Callipogon cinnamomeus
- Cerambyx festivus – Chlorida festivus
- Cerambyx lineatus – Elateropsis lineatus
- Cerambyx spinibarbis – Mallodon spinibarbis
- Cerambyx batus – Juiaparus batus
- Cerambyx rubus – Batocera rubus
- Cerambyx ferrugineus
- Cerambyx sentis – Batocera sentis
- Cerambyx farinosus – Taeniotes farinosus
- Cerambyx depressus – Macropophora trochlearis
- Cerambyx glaucus – Oreodera glauca
- Cerambyx lamed – Pachyta lamed
- Cerambyx nebulosus – Leiopus nebulosus
- Cerambyx hispidus – Pogonocherus hispidus
- Cerambyx desertus – Epepeotes desertus
- Cerambyx succinctus – Trachyderes succinctus
- Cerambyx virens
- Cerambyx moschatus – Aromia moschata
- Cerambyx alpinus – Rosalia alpina
- Cerambyx aedilis – Acanthocinus aedilis
- Cerambyx sutor – Monochamus sutor
- Cerambyx cerdo – Cerambyx cerdo
- Cerambyx textor – Lamia textor
- Cerambyx fuliginator – Iberodorcadion fuliginator
- Cerambyx coquus – Tragiodon coquus
- Cerambyx cursor – Oxymirus cursor
- Cerambyx kaehleri – Purpuricenus kaehleri
- Cerambyx inquisitor – Rhagium inquisitor
- Cerambyx fur – Ptinus fur
- Cerambyx carcharias – Saperda carcharias
- Cerambyx scalaris – Saperda scalaris
- Cerambyx populneus – Saperda populnea
- Cerambyx cylindricus – Phytoecia cylindrica
- Cerambyx oculatus – Oberea oculata
- Cerambyx zonarius – Gnoma zonaria
- Cerambyx serraticornis – Calopus serraticornis
- Cerambyx rusticus – Arhopalus rusticus
- Cerambyx femoratus – Ropalopus femoratus
- Cerambyx violaceus – Callidium violaceum
- Cerambyx auratus – Hileolaspis auratus
- Cerambyx stigma – Neomegaderus stigma
- Cerambyx striatus – Asemum striatum
- Cerambyx testaceus – Phymatodes testaceus
- Cerambyx bajulus – Hylotrupes bajulus
- Cerambyx fennicus – Phymatodes testaceus
- Cerambyx undatus – Semanotus undatus
- Cerambyx sanguineus – Pyrrhidium sanguineum
- Cerambyx castaneus – Tetropium castaenum

== Leptura ==
- Leptura aquatica – Donacia aquatica
- Leptura melanura – Stenurella melanura
- Leptura rubra – Stictoleptura rubra
- Leptura virens – Lepturobosca virens
- Leptura sericea – Plateumaris sericea
- Leptura 4-maculata – Pachyta quadrimaculata
- Leptura meridiana – Stenocorus meridianus
- Leptura interrogationis – Brachyta interrogationis
- Leptura 6-maculata – Judolia sexmaculata
- Leptura 4-fasciata – Leptura quadrifasciata
- Leptura attenuata – Strangalia attenuata
- Leptura nigra – Stenurella nigra
- Leptura virginea – Gaurotes virginea
- Leptura collaris – Dinoptera collaris
- Leptura rustica – Xylotrechus rusticus
- Leptura mystica – Anaglyptus mysticus
- Leptura necydalea – Isthmiade necydalea
- Leptura detrita – Plagionotus detritus
- Leptura arcuata – Plagionotus arcuatus
- Leptura arietis – Clytus arietis
- Leptura praeusta – Tetrops praeusta
- Leptura linearis

== Cantharis (soldier beetles) ==
- Cantharis noctiluca – Lampyris noctiluca, the common glow-worm
- Cantharis pyralis – Photinus pyralis
- Cantharis lampyris
- Cantharis ignita – Aspisoma ignitum
- Cantharis lucida
- Cantharis phosphorea
- Cantharis mauritanica – Pelania mauritanica
- Cantharis chinensis
- Cantharis italica – Luciola italica
- Cantharis fusca – Cantharis fusca
- Cantharis livida – Cantharis livida
- Cantharis rufa – Cantharis rufa
- Cantharis sanguinea – Lygistopterus sanguineus
- Cantharis obscura – Cantharis obscura
- Cantharis lateralis – Cantharis lateralis
- Cantharis aenea – Malachius aeneus
- Cantharis bipustulata – Malachius bipustulatus
- Cantharis pedicularia – Ebaeus pedicularius
- Cantharis fasciata – Anthocomus fasciatus
- Cantharis biguttata – Malthinus biguttatus
- Cantharis minima – Malthodes minimus
- Cantharis testacea – Rhagonycha testacea
- Cantharis pectinata
- Cantharis serrata
- Cantharis tropica
- Cantharis pectinicornis – Schizotus pectinicornis
- Cantharis caerulea – Ischnomera caerulea
- Cantharis viridissima – Chrysanthia viridissima
- Cantharis navalis – Lymexylon navale
- Cantharis melanura – Nacerdes melanura

== Elater (click beetles) ==
- Elater oculatus – Alaus oculatus
- Elater noctilucus – Pyrophorus noctilucus
- Elater phosphoreus – Ignelater phosphoreus
- Elater brunneus – Sericus brunneus
- Elater syriacus – Cardiophorus syriacus
- Elater cruciatus – Selatosomus cruciatus
- Elater linearis – Denticollis linearis
- Elater ruficollis – Cardiophorus ruficollis
- Elater mesomelus – Denticollis linearis
- Elater castaneus – Anostirus castaneus
- Elater ferrugineus – Elater ferrugineus
- Elater sanguineus – Ampedus sanguineus
- Elater balteatus – Ampedus balteatus
- Elater marginatus – Dalopius marginatus
- Elater sputator – Agriotes sputator
- Elater obscurus – Agriotes obscurus
- Elater tristis – Ampedus tristis
- Elater fasciatus – Danosoma fasciatum
- Elater murinus – Agrypnus murinus
- Elater tessellatus – Prosternon tessellatum
- Elater aeneus – Selatosomus aeneus
- Elater pectinicornis – Ctenicera pectinicornis
- Elater niger – Hemicrepidius niger
- Elater minutus – Limonius minutus

== Cicindela (ground beetles) ==
- Cicindela campestris – Cicindela campestris, the green tiger beetle
- Cicindela hybrida – Cicindela hybrida, the northern dune tiger beetle
- Cicindela germanica – Cylindera germanica
- Cicindela sylvatica – Cicindela sylvatica, the wood tiger beetle
- Cicindela maura – Cassolaia maura
- Cicindela riparia – Elaphrus riparius
- Cicindela aquatica – Notiophilus aquaticus

== Buprestis (jewel beetles) ==
- Buprestis gigantea – Euchroma gigantea
- Buprestis 8-guttata – Buprestis octoguttata
- Buprestis gnita – Chrysochroa ignita
- Buprestis stricta – Pelecopselaphus strictus
- Buprestis sternicornis – Sternocera sternicornis
- Buprestis mariana – Chalcophora mariana
- Buprestis chrysostigma – Chrysobothris chrysostigma
- Buprestis rustica – Buprestis rustica
- Buprestis fascicularis – Julodis fascicularis
- Buprestis hirta – Neojulodis hirta
- Buprestis nitidula – Anthaxia nitidula
- Buprestis bimaculata – Strigoptera bimaculata
- Buprestis tristis – Lampetis tristis
- Buprestis cuprea – Oedisterna cuprea
- Buprestis nobilis – Actenodes nobilis
- Buprestis 4-punctata – Anthaxia quadripunctata
- Buprestis minuta – Trachys minutus
- Buprestis viridis – Agrilus viridis
- Buprestis linearis – Dismorpha linearis

== Dytiscus (Dytiscidae) ==
- Dytiscus piceus – Hydrophilus piceus
- Dytiscus caraboides – Hydrochara caraboides
- Dytiscus fuscipes – Hydrobius fuscipes
- Dytiscus latissimus – Dytiscus latissimus
- Dytiscus marginalis – Great diving beetle
- Dytiscus striatus – Colymbetes striatus
- Dytiscus fuscus – Colymbetes fuscus
- Dytiscus cinereus – Graphoderus cinereus
- Dytiscus semistriatus – Dytiscus marginalis
- Dytiscus sulcatus – Acilius sulcatus
- Dytiscus erytrocephalus – Hydroporus erythrocephalus
- Dytiscus maculatus – Platambus maculatus
- Dytiscus minutus – Laccophilus minutus
- Dytiscus natator – Gyrinus natator
- Dytiscus scarabaeoides – Hydrobius fuscipes

== Carabus ==
- Carabus coriaceus – Carabus coriaceus
- Carabus granulatus – Carabus granulatus
- Carabus leucophthalmus – Sphodrus leucophthalmus
- Carabus nitens – Carabus nitens
- Carabus hortensis – Carabus hortensis
- Carabus violaceus – Carabus violaceus
- Carabus cephalotes – Broscus cephalotes
- Carabus inquisitor – Calosoma inquisitor
- Carabus sycophanta – Calosoma sycophanta
- Carabus lividus – Nebria livida
- Carabus crepitans – Brachinus crepitans
- Carabus americanus – Galerita americana
- Carabus spinipes – Amara aulica
- Carabus cyanocephalus – Lebia cyanocephala
- Carabus melanocephalus – Calathus melanocephalus
- Carabus vaporariorum – Cymindis vaporariorum
- Carabus latus – Harpalus latus
- Carabus ferrugineus – Leistus ferrugineus
- Carabus germanus – Diachromus germanus
- Carabus vulgaris – Pterostichus melanarius
- Carabus caerulescens – Poecilus cupreus
- Carabus cupreus – Poecilus cupreus
- Carabus piceus – Agonum piceum
- Carabus marginatus – Agonum marginatum
- Carabus multipunctatus – Blethisa multipunctata
- Carabus 6-punctatus – Agonum sexpunctatum
- Carabus ustulatus
- Carabus crux major – Panagaeus cruxmajor
- Carabus crux minor – Lebia cruxminor
- Carabus 4-maculatus – Dromius quadrimaculatus
- Carabus atricapillus – Demetrias atricapillus

== Tenebrio (darkling beetles) ==
- Tenebrio molitor – Mealworm
- Tenebrio mauritanicus – Tenebroides mauritanicus, the Cadelle Beetle
- Tenebrio culinaris – Uloma culinaris
- Tenebrio barbarus
- Tenebrio fossor – Clivina fossor
- Tenebrio cursor – Oryzaephilus surinamensis
- Tenebrio pedicularius
- Tenebrio erraticus
- Tenebrio pallens – Antherophagus pallens
- Tenebrio mortisagus – Blaps mortisaga
- Tenebrio muricatus – Adesmia muricata
- Tenebrio caeruleus – Helops caeruleus
- Tenebrio angulatus
- Tenebrio caraboides – Cychrus caraboides

== Meloe (blister beetles) ==
- Meloe proscarabaeus – Meloe proscarabaeus
- Meloe majalis
- Meloe vesicatorius – Lytta vesicatoria, Spanish fly
- Meloe syriacus
- Meloe cichorii
- Meloe algiricus
- Meloe schaefferi – Cerocoma schaefferi
- Meloe floralis

== Mordella (tumbling flower beetles) ==
- Mordella aculeata – Mordella aculeata
- Mordella humeralis – Mordellistena humeralis
- Mordella frontalis – Anaspis frontalis
- Mordella thoracica – Anaspis thoracica
- Mordella flava – Anaspis flava

== Necydalis (necydaline beetles) ==
- Necydalis major – Necydalis major
- Necydalis minor – Molorchus minor

== Staphylinus (rove beetles) ==
- Staphylinus hirtus – Emus hirtus
- Staphylinus murinus – Ontholestes murinus
- Staphylinus maxillosus – Creophilus maxillosus
- Staphylinus erytropterus – Staphylinus erythropterus
- Staphylinus politus – Philonthus polius
- Staphylinus rufus Oxyporus rufus
- Staphylinus riparius – Paederus riparius
- Staphylinus lignorum – Tachinus lignorum
- Staphylinus subterraneus – Tachinus subterraneus
- Staphylinus flavescens – Quedius cinctus
- Staphylinus 2-guttatus – Stenus biguttatus
- Staphylinus littoreus – Sepedophilus pubescens
- Staphylinus sanguineus – Aleochara sanguinea
- Staphylinus caraboides – Anthophagus caraboides
- Staphylinus chrysomelinus – Tachyporus chrysomelinus
- Staphylinus flavipes – Phloestiba plana
- Staphylinus fuscipes – Gyrohypnus fuscipes
- Staphylinus rufipes – Tachinus rufipes
- Staphylinus boleti – Gyrophaena boleti

== Forficula (earwigs) ==
- Forficula auricularia – Forficula auricularia
- Forficula minor – Labia minor

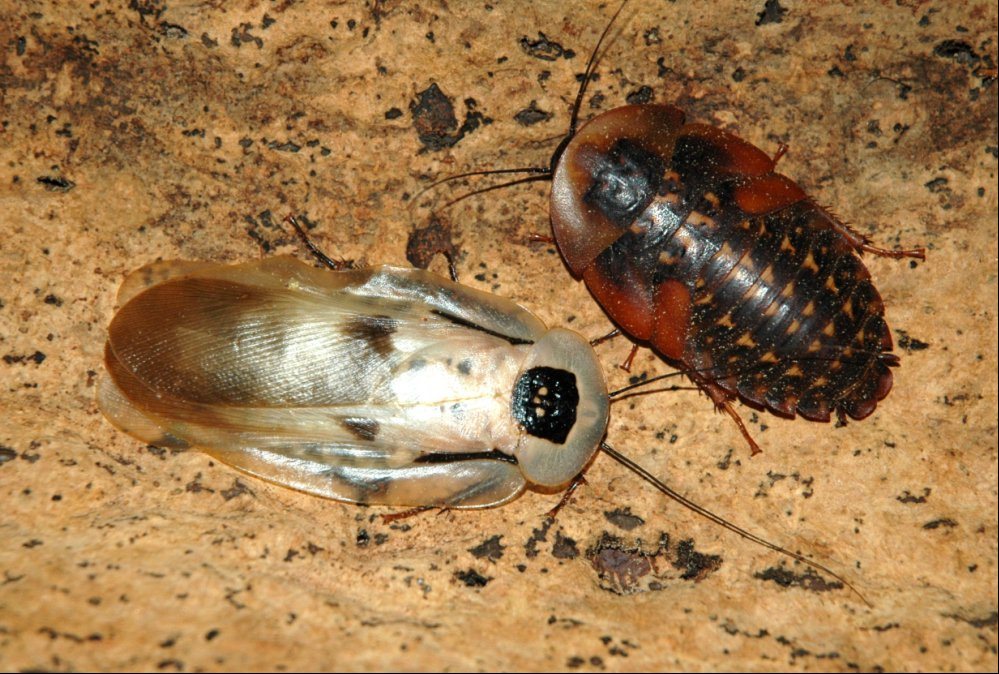
Blaberus giganteus was named Blatta gigantea in 1758.

== Blatta (cockroaches) ==
(Note: The current names of all Linnaeus' Blatta species are taken from Marshall (1983).)

- Blatta gigantea – Blaberus giganteus
- Blatta aegyptiaca – Polyphaga aegyptiaca
- Blatta surinamensis – Pycnoscelus surinamensis, Surinam cockroach
- Blatta americana – Periplaneta americana, American cockroach
- Blatta nivea – Panchlora nivea
- Blatta africana – Hemelytroblatta africana
- Blatta orientalis – Blatta orientalis, Oriental cockroach
- Blatta lapponica – Ectobius lapponicus
- Blatta oblongata – Pseudomops oblongata

== Gryllus (grasshoppers and other orthopteroid insects) ==
(Note: The current names of all Linnaeus' Gryllus species are taken from Marshall (1983).)

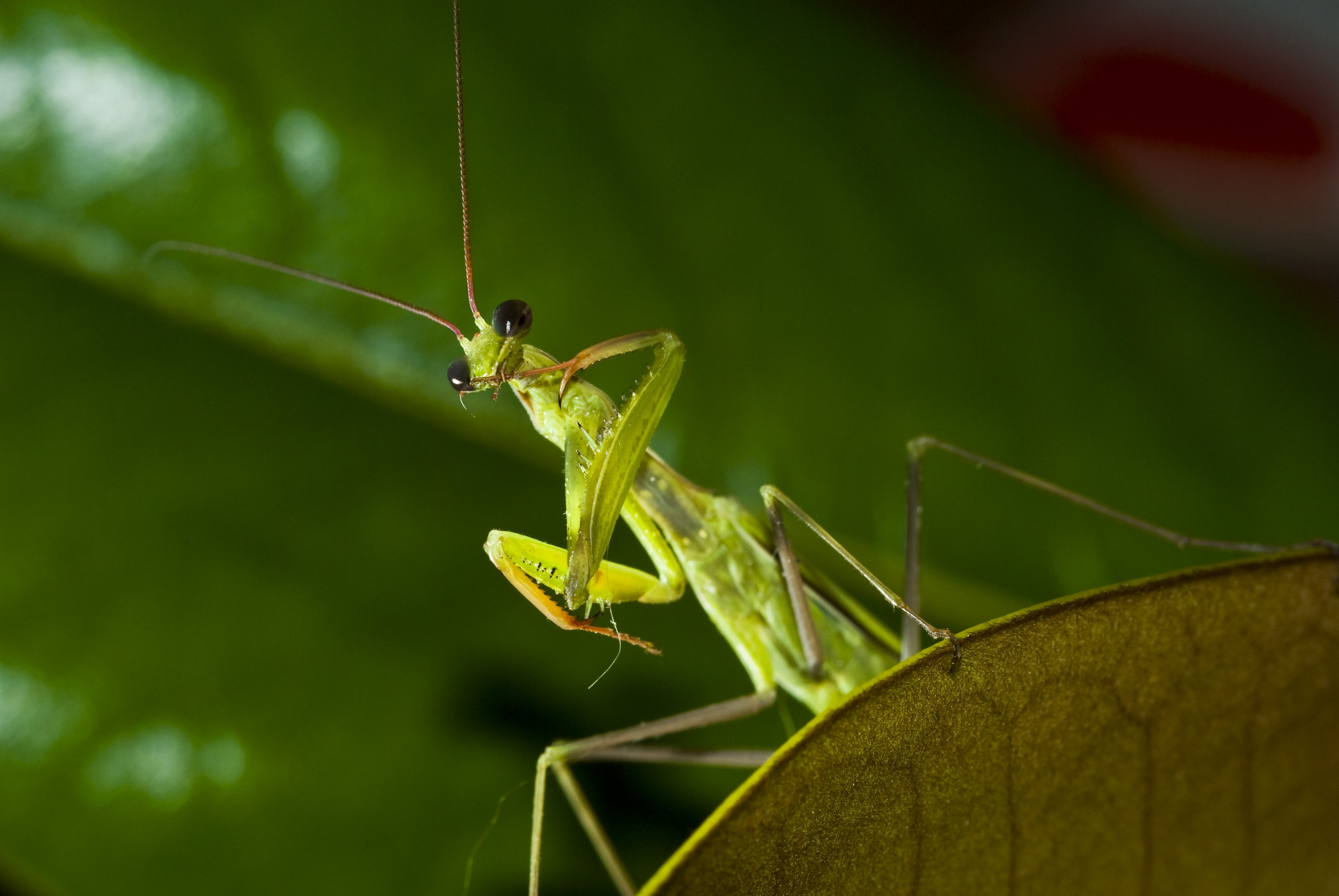
The European mantis was named Gryllus Mantis religiosus in 1758.

=== Mantis (mantises and stick insects) ===
- Gryllus gigas – Phasma gigas
- Gryllus phthisicus – Pseudophasma phthisicum
- Gryllus siccifolius – Phyllium siccifolium
- Gryllus gongylodes – Gongylus gongylodes
- Gryllus religiosus – Mantis religiosa, European mantis
- Gryllus oratorius – Iris oratoria
- Gryllus precarius – Stagmatoptera precaria
- Gryllus bicornis – Schizocephala bicornis
- Gryllus tricolor – Harpagomantis tricolor
- Gryllus strumarius – Choeradodis strumaria

=== Acrida ===
- Gryllus nasutus – Truxalis nasuta
- Gryllus turritus – Acrida turrita

=== Bulla ===
- Gryllus unicolor – Bullacris unicolor
- Gryllus variolosus – Physemacris variolosa
- Gryllus serratus – Prionolopha serrata
- Gryllus carinatus – Porthetis carinata
- Gryllus bipunctatus – Tetrix bipunctata
- Gryllus subulatus – Tetrix subulata

=== Acheta ===
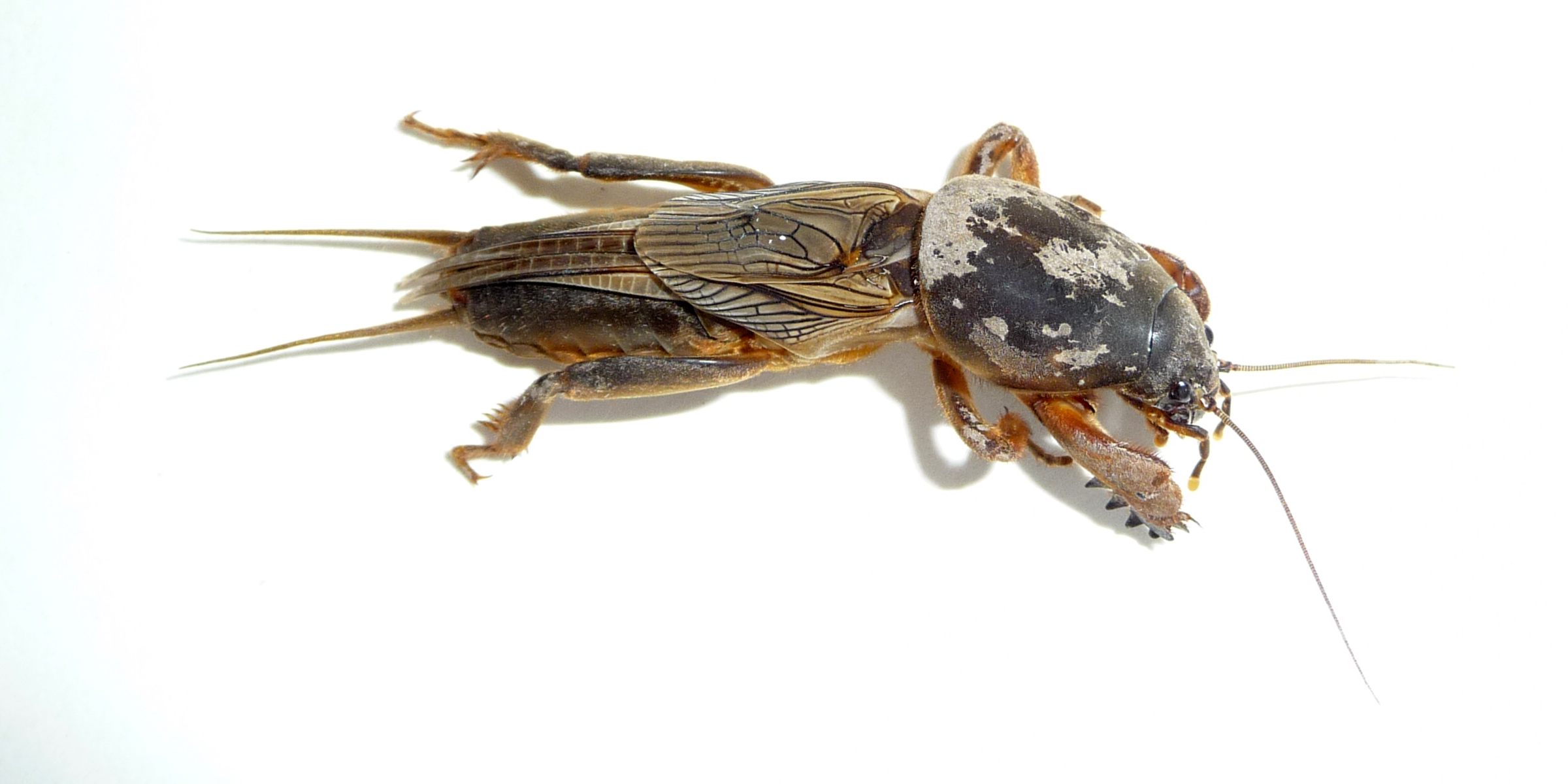
Gryllotalpa gryllotalpa was named Gryllus Acheta gryllotalpa in 1758.

- Gryllus gryllotalpa – Gryllotalpa gryllotalpa
- Gryllus domesticus – Gryllus domesticus, house cricket
- Gryllus campestris – Gryllus campestris
- Gryllus umbraculatus – Sciobia umbraculata

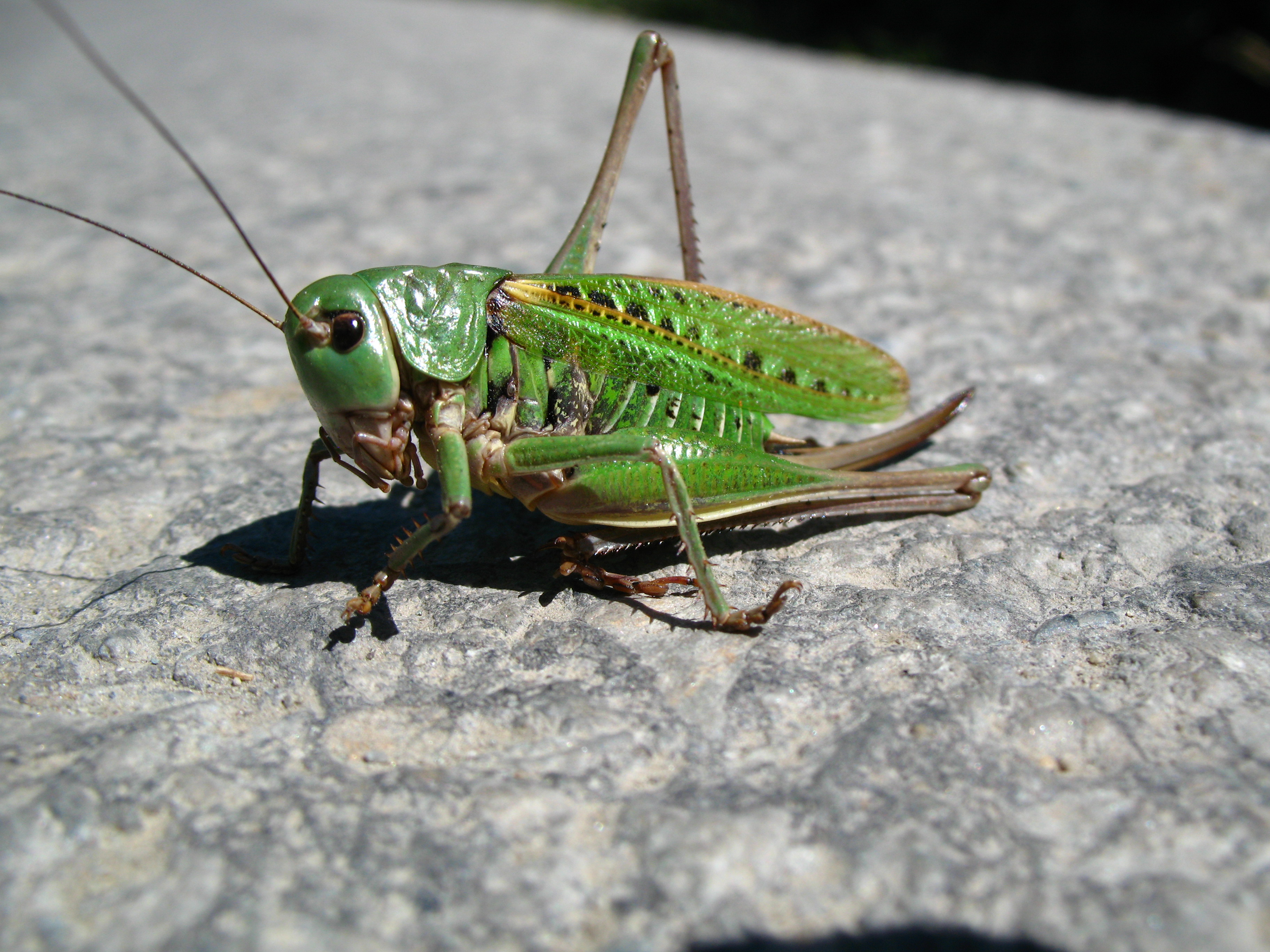
The wart-biter was named Gryllus Tettigonia verrucivorus in 1758.

=== Tettigonia ===
- Gryllus citrifolius – Cnemidophyllum citrifolium
- Gryllus laurifolius – Stilpnochlora laurifolia
- Gryllus myrtifolius – Viadana myrtifolia
- Gryllus elongatus – Mecopoda elongata
- Gryllus lamellatus – Anoedopoda lamellata
- Gryllus ocellatus – Pterochroza ocellata
- Gryllus acuminatus – Oxyprora acuminata
- Gryllus triops – Neoconocephalus triops
- Gryllus rugosus – Sathrophyllia rugosa
- Gryllus coronatus – Championica coronata
- Gryllus aquilinus – Acanthodis aquilina
- Gryllus melanopterus – Clonia melanoptera
- Gryllus fastigiatus – Gryllacris fastigiata
- Gryllus coriaceus – Sexava coriacea
- Gryllus viridissimus – Tettigonia viridissima
- Gryllus verrucivorus – Decticus verrucivorus, wart-biter
- Gryllus pupus – Hetrodes pupus

=== Locusta ===
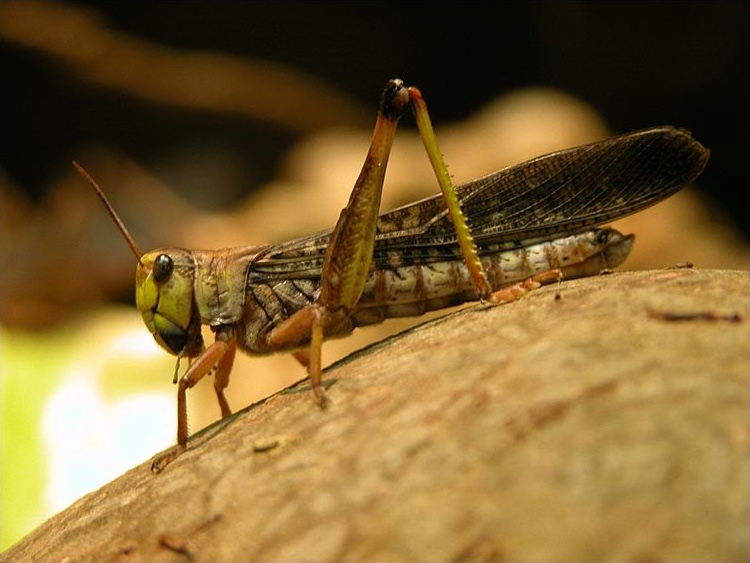
The migratory locust was named Gryllus Locusta migratorius in 1758.

- Gryllus elephas – Pamphagus elephas
- Gryllus cristatus – Tropidacris cristata
- Gryllus morbillosus – Phymateus morbillosus
- Gryllus miliaris – Aularches miliaris
- Gryllus haematopus – Euryphymus haematopus
- Gryllus migratorius – Migratory locust
- Gryllus tataricus – Cyrtacanthacaris tatarica
- Gryllus variegatus – Zonocerus variegatus
- Gryllus caerulescens – Oedipoda caerulescens
- Gryllus italicus – Calliptamus italicus
- Gryllus stridulus – Psophus stridulus
- Gryllus carolinus – Dissosteira carolina
- Gryllus obscurus – Pycnodictya obscura
- Gryllus flavus – Oedaleus flavus
- Gryllus apricarius – Chorthippus apricarius
- Gryllus viridulus – Omocestus viridulus
- Gryllus biguttulus – Chorthippus biguttulus
- Gryllus rufus – Gomphocerippus rufus
- Gryllus grossus – Stethophyma grossum
- Gryllus pedestris – Podisma pedestris
