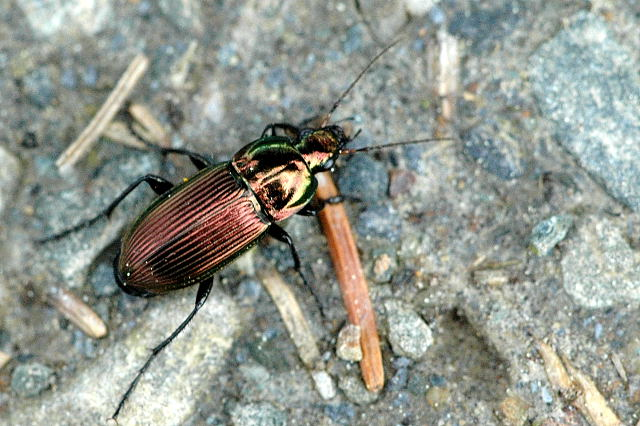
- Poecilus cupreus, Belgium

Scientific classification
- Kingdom: Animalia
- Phylum: Arthropoda
- Class: Insecta
- Order: Coleoptera
- Suborder: Adephaga
- Family: Carabidae
- Subfamily: Pterostichinae
- Tribe: Pterostichini
- Genus: Poecilus
- Species: P. cupreus

Binomial name
- Poecilus cupreus (Linnaeus, 1758)

= Poecilus cupreus =

Species of beetle

Poecilus cupreus is a species of woodland ground beetle in the family Carabidae. It is native to the Palearctic, and is widespread throughout Europe.

== Subspecies ==
These four subspecies belong to the species Poecilus cupreus:

- Poecilus cupreus cupreus (Linnaeus, 1758)
- Poecilus cupreus dinniki (Lutshnik, 1912)
- Poecilus cupreus erythropus Dejean, 1828
- Poecilus cupreus matthiesseni (Lutshnik, 1930)
