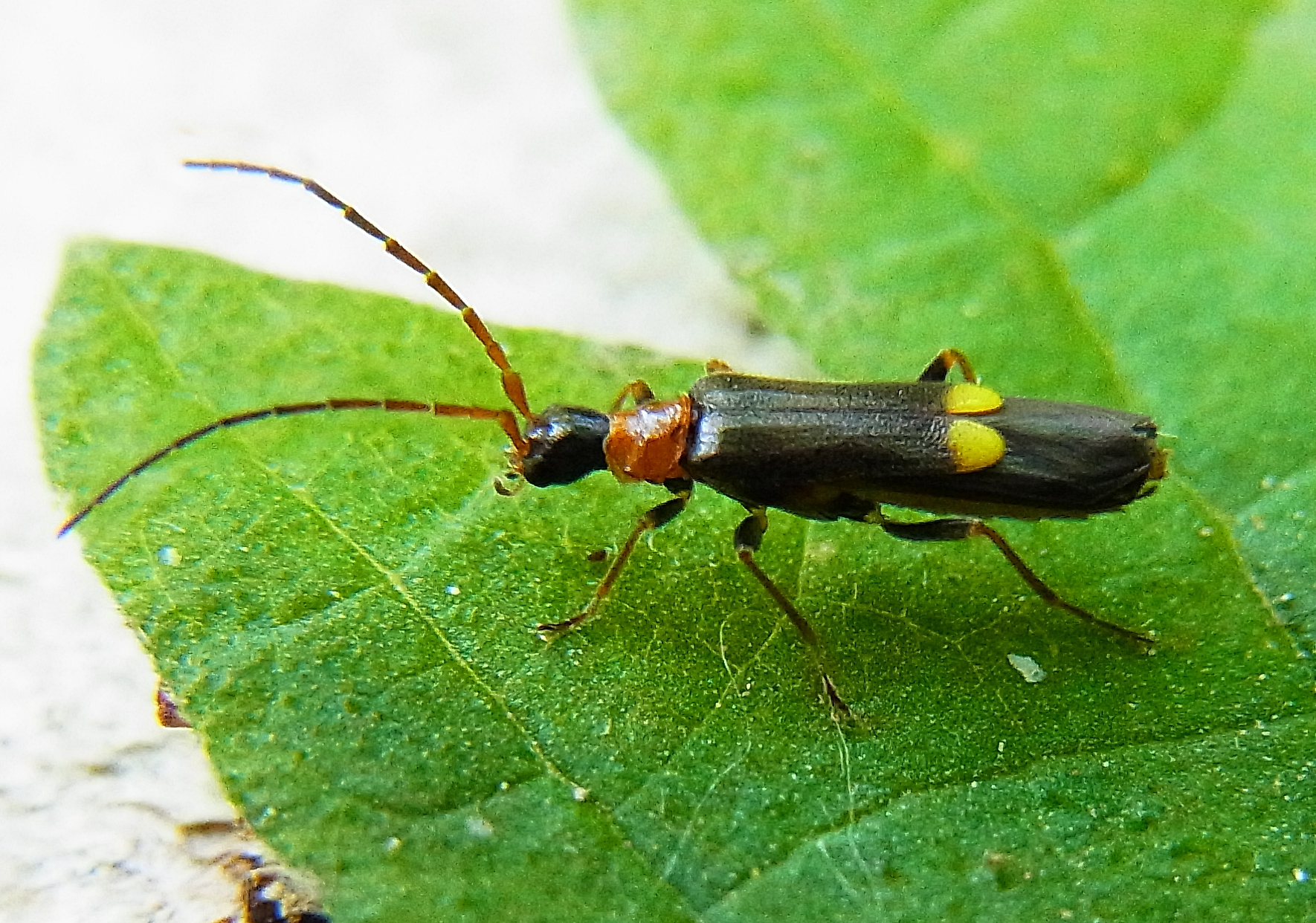
- Malthodes minimus

Scientific classification
- Kingdom: Animalia
- Phylum: Arthropoda
- Class: Insecta
- Order: Coleoptera
- Suborder: Polyphaga
- Infraorder: Elateriformia
- Family: Cantharidae
- Genus: Malthodes
- Species: M. minimus

Binomial name
- Malthodes minimus (Linnaeus, 1758)

= Malthodes minimus =

Species of beetle

Malthodes minimus is a species of soldier beetles native to Europe.
