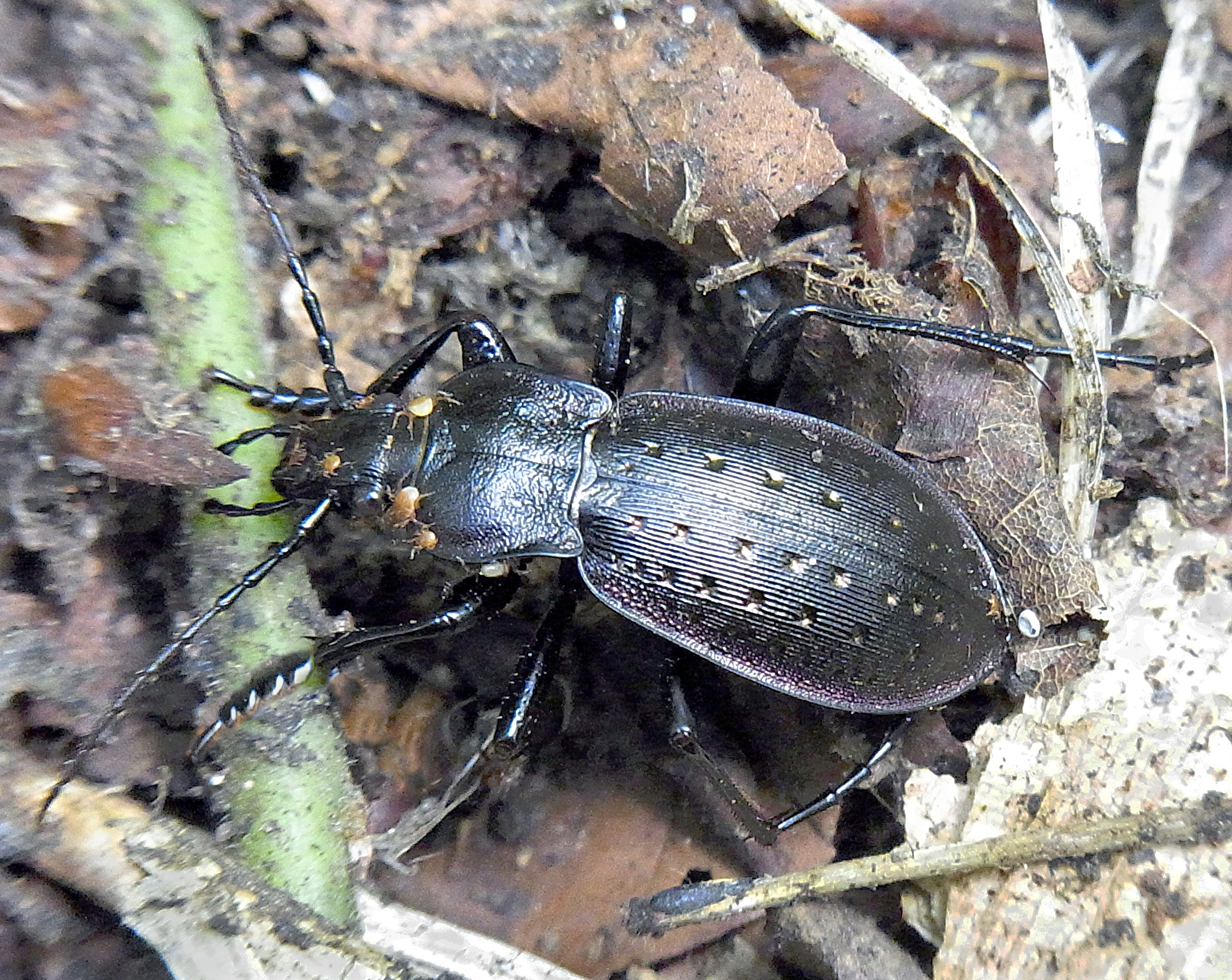
- Carabus hortensis with mites

Scientific classification
- Kingdom: Animalia
- Phylum: Arthropoda
- Class: Insecta
- Order: Coleoptera
- Suborder: Adephaga
- Family: Carabidae
- Genus: Carabus
- Species: C. hortensis

Binomial name
- Carabus hortensis Linnaeus, 1758

Synonyms
- Carabus herzegowinensis Apfelbeck, 1904; Carabus starygradensis Born, 1912

= Carabus hortensis =

Species of beetle

Carabus hortensis, the garden ground beetle, is a species of beetle in the Oreocarabus subgenus which can be found throughout Europe but is rarer in the extreme southwest. It is common in the Middle East.
