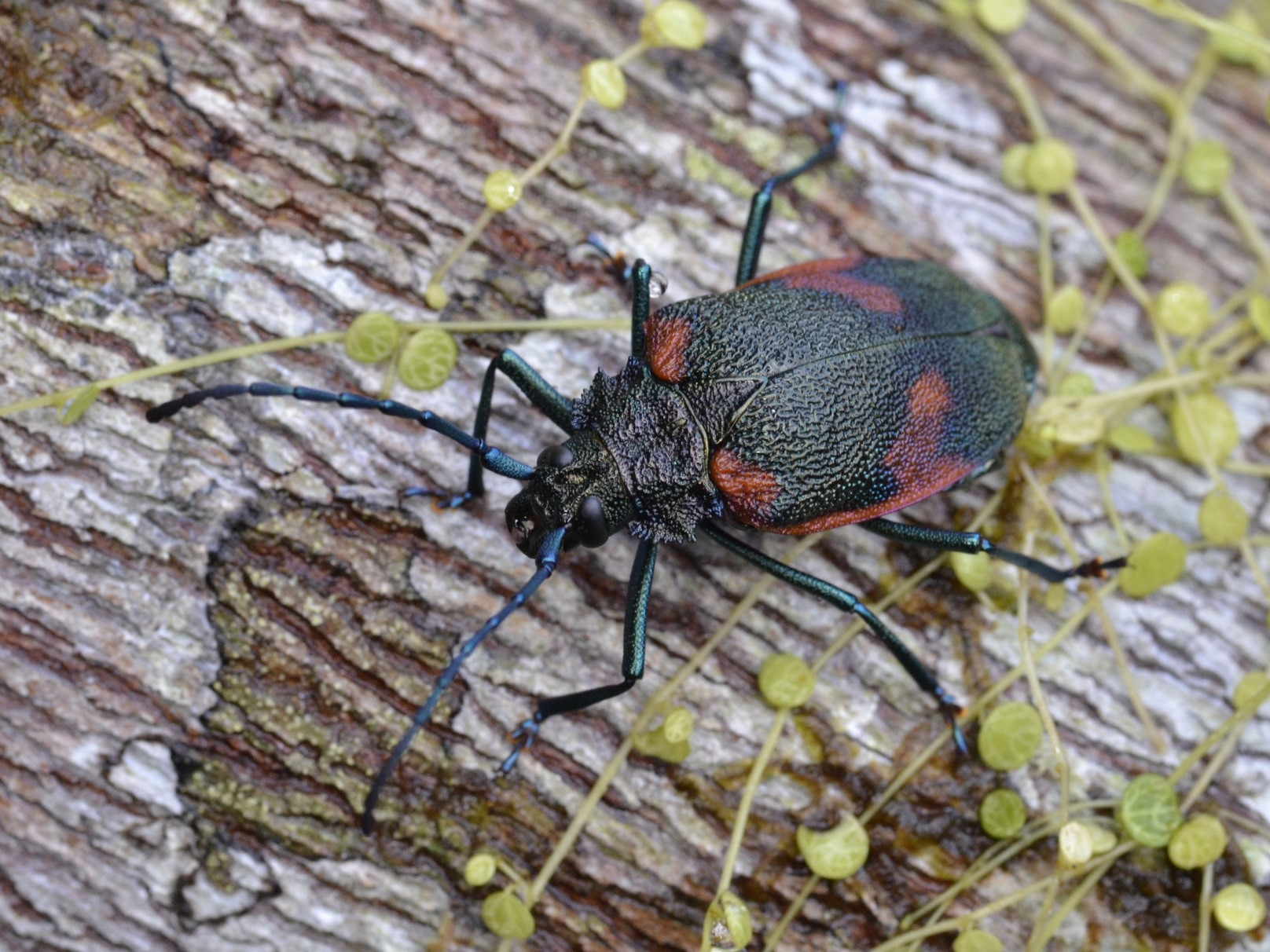

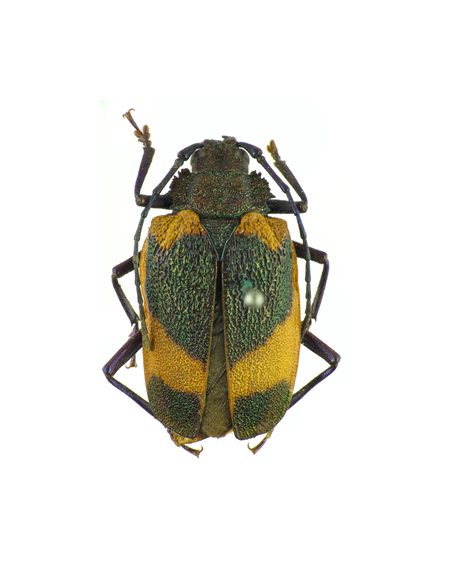

Scientific classification
- Kingdom: Animalia
- Phylum: Arthropoda
- Clade: Pancrustacea
- Class: Insecta
- Order: Coleoptera
- Suborder: Polyphaga
- Infraorder: Cucujiformia
- Family: Cerambycidae
- Subfamily: Prioninae
- Tribe: Mallaspini
- Genus: Hileolaspis; Galileo & Martins, 1992
- Species: H. auratus

Binomial name
- Hileolaspis auratus (Linnaeus, 1758)

Synonyms
- Cerambyx auratus Linné, 1758; Esmeralda insignis Nonfried, 1894; Pyrodes candezei Lameere, 1885; Pyrodes dispar Bates, 1869; Pyrodes nodicornis Bates, 1869; Pyrodes gratiosus Bates, 1869; Pyrodes rubrozonatus Lucas, 1859; Pyrodes nigricornis Guérin-Méneville, 1855; Prionus amazonus Fabricius, 1802; Cerambyx amazonus Voet, 1781; Cerambyx bifasciatus Linné, 1767

= Hileolaspis =

Hileolaspis auratus

Genus of beetles

Hileolaspis is a genus of beetles in the family Cerambycidae. It is monotypic, being represented by the single species Hileolaspis auratus. This species is found in Colombia, Venezuela, Peru, Surinam, Guyana, French Guiana, Brazil (Acre, Amazonas, Pará, Mato Grosso), Bolivia and Paraguay.

Linnaeus described this species based on a specimen collected by Daniel Rolander in Suriname. His description reads: Cerambyx with lateral thoracic tooth somewhat golden-green, antennae black, hind femora dark blue. Habitat in America. It is similar to C. violaceo. Head and thorax golden-green. Thoracic margin concave excavated between base and lateral tooth. Elytra red-green-gold, slightly longer than body. Abdomen and whole underside of body green-bronze. Legs purple: hind femora dark-blue.
