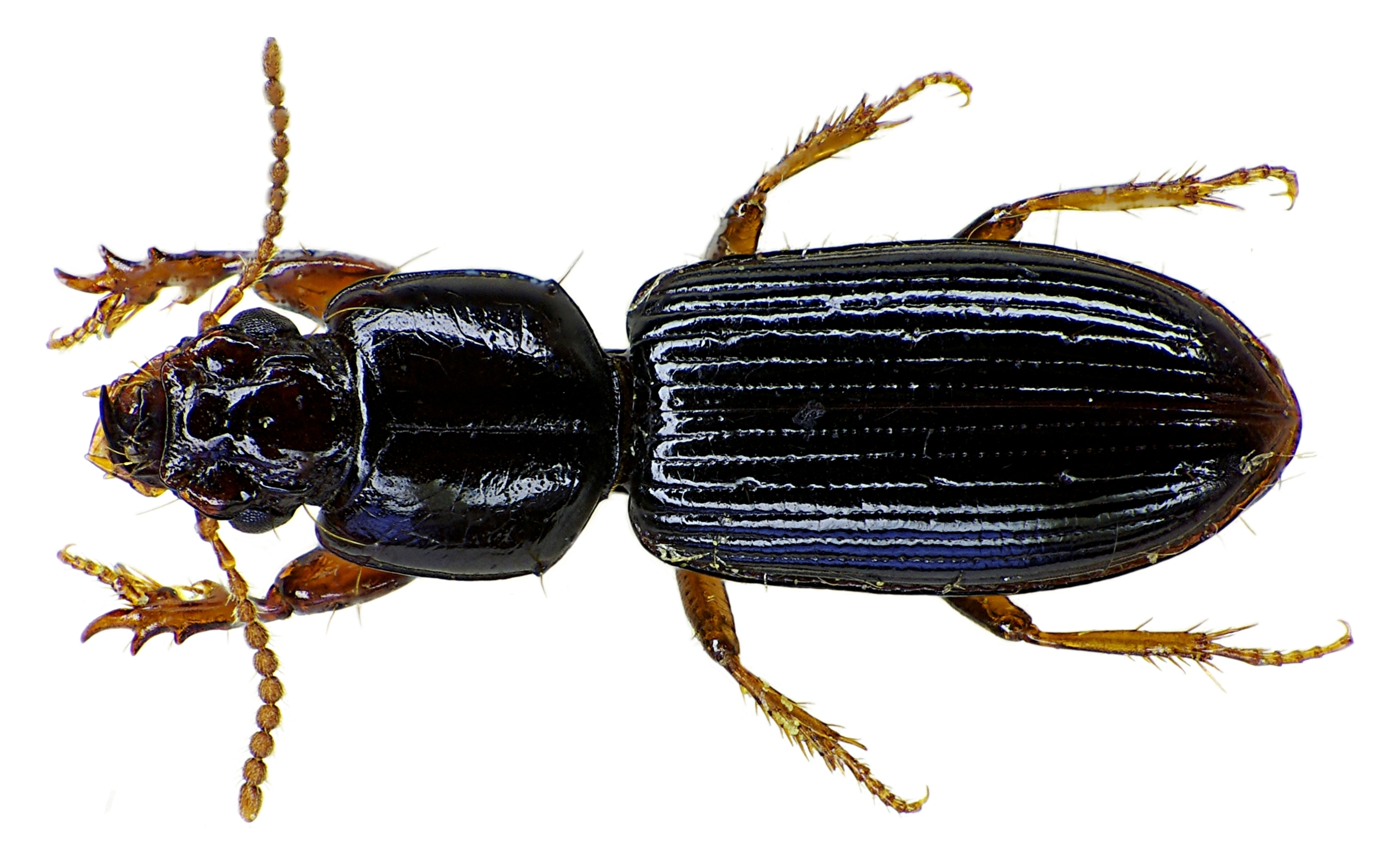

Scientific classification
- Kingdom: Animalia
- Phylum: Arthropoda
- Clade: Pancrustacea
- Class: Insecta
- Order: Coleoptera
- Suborder: Adephaga
- Family: Carabidae
- Genus: Clivina
- Species: C. fossor

Binomial name
- Clivina fossor (Linnaeus, 1758)

= Clivina fossor =

Species of beetle

Clivina fossor is a species of ground beetle in the subfamily Scaritinae. It was described by Carl Linnaeus in 1758.
