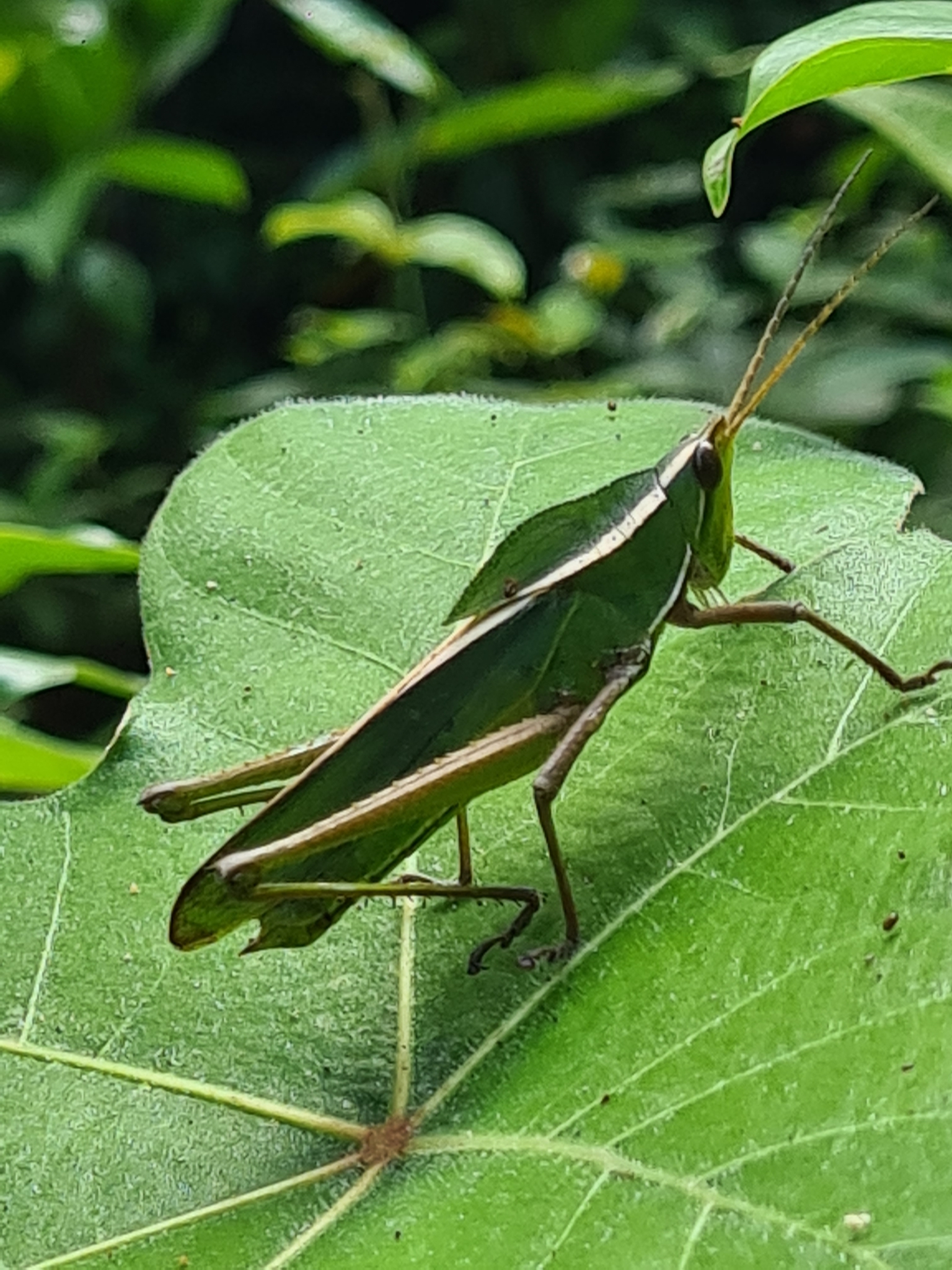

Scientific classification
- Kingdom: Animalia
- Phylum: Arthropoda
- Class: Insecta
- Order: Orthoptera
- Suborder: Caelifera
- Family: Romaleidae
- Genus: Prionolopha
- Species: P. serrata

Binomial name
- Prionolopha serrata (Linnaeus, 1758)

= Prionolopha serrata =

Species of insect

Prionolopha serrata is a species of grasshopper from the monotypic genus Prionolopha. It is found in South America.
