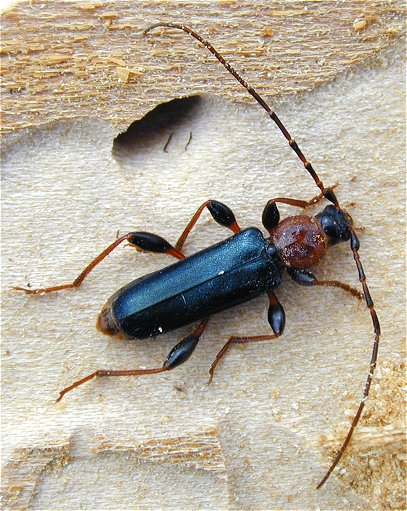

Scientific classification
- Kingdom: Animalia
- Phylum: Arthropoda
- Clade: Pancrustacea
- Class: Insecta
- Order: Coleoptera
- Suborder: Polyphaga
- Infraorder: Cucujiformia
- Family: Cerambycidae
- Genus: Phymatodes
- Species: P. testaceus

Binomial name
- Phymatodes testaceus (Linnaeus, 1758)

= Phymatodes testaceus =

Species of beetle

Phymatodes testaceus (commonly known as the tanbark borer, or the violet tanbark beetle) is a transpalearctic polymorphic species of beetle in the subfamily Cerambycinae in the longhorn beetle family.

The P. testaceus imago is typically 6–16 mm in length. Their eggs are 1 mm long, and in athwart 0.5 mm. Larvae of the species are 10–18 mm long and 2.1 mm wide. Pupa are 9 mm long, and the abdomen is 2.8 mm wide.

Distribution of these beetle extends from the European Atlantic coastline to the Southern Ural Mountains, from southern Sweden and Norway to North Africa and Syria. It is also distributed throughout Japan and North America.

Larvae develop in and under the bark of various deciduous tree species, causing damage. Larvae pupate in the spring. The beetle's life cycle lasts one year in central and southern parts, and two years in northern climes.
