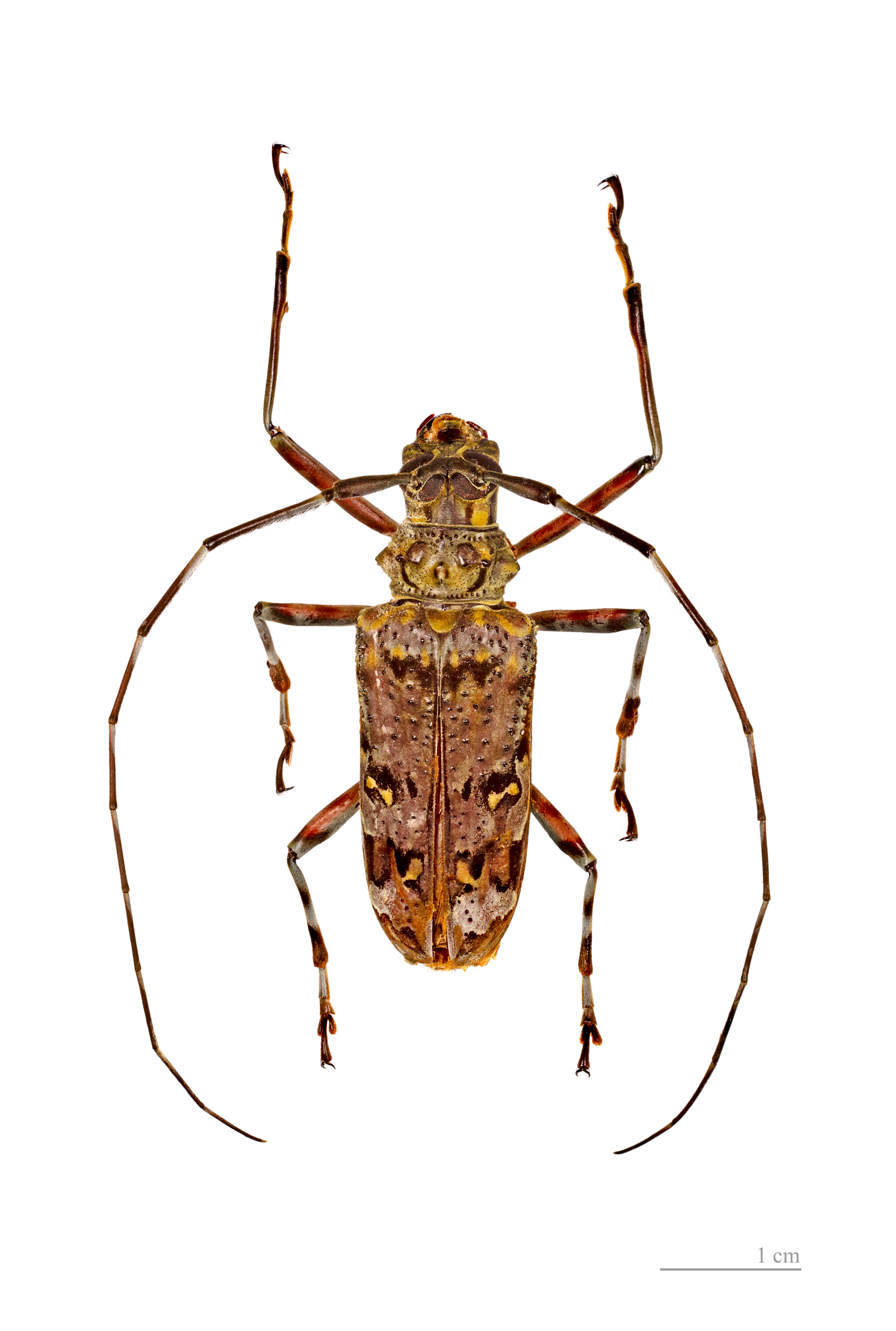
- Macropophora trochlearis MHNT
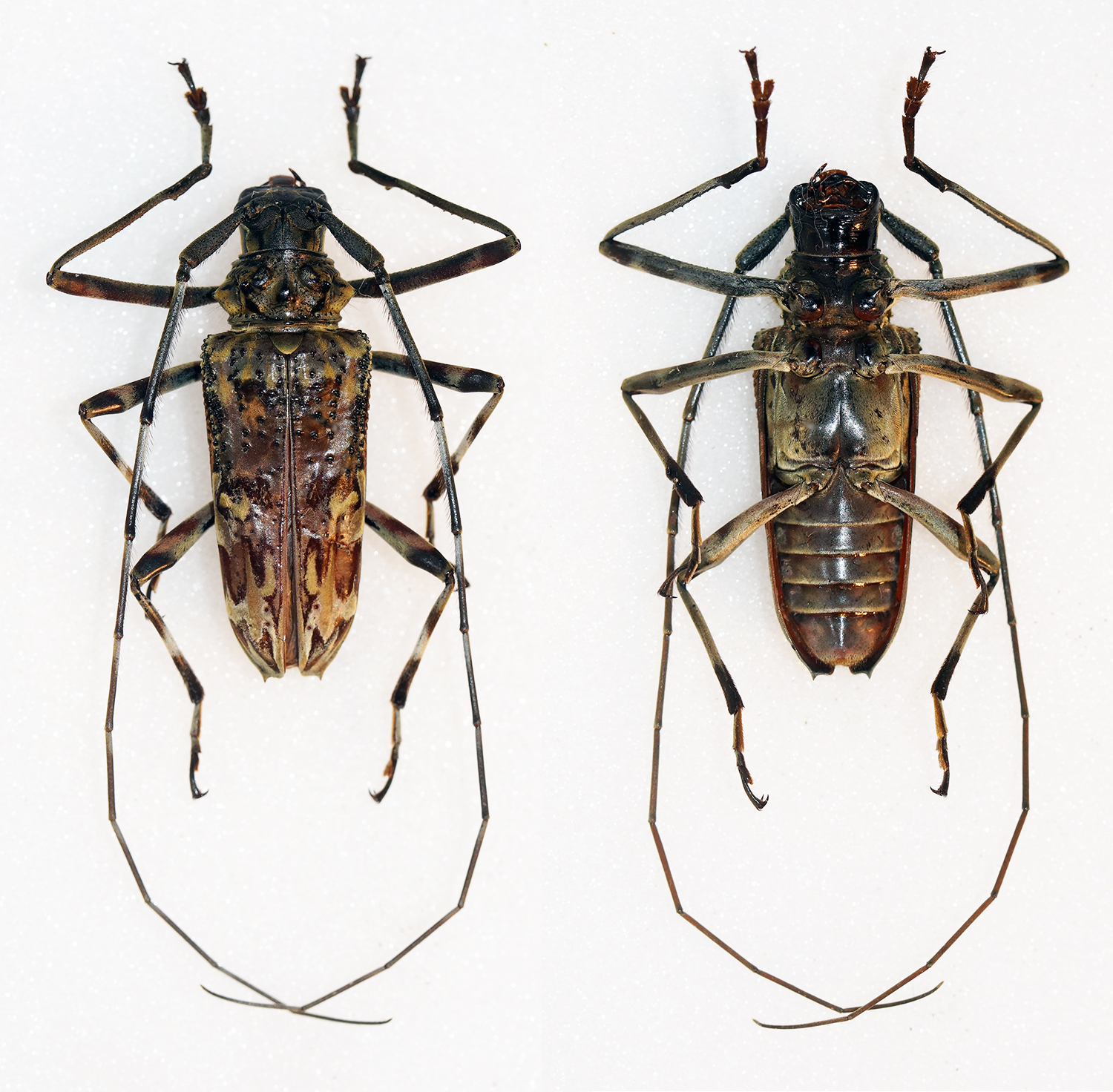

Scientific classification
- Kingdom: Animalia
- Phylum: Arthropoda
- Class: Insecta
- Order: Coleoptera
- Suborder: Polyphaga
- Infraorder: Cucujiformia
- Family: Cerambycidae
- Genus: Macropophora
- Species: M. trochlearis

Binomial name
- Macropophora trochlearis (Linnaeus, 1758)

= Macropophora trochlearis =

Species of beetle

Macropophora trochlearis is a species of beetle in the family Cerambycidae. It was described by Carl Linnaeus in 1758. The species fly from June to August throughout South America.
