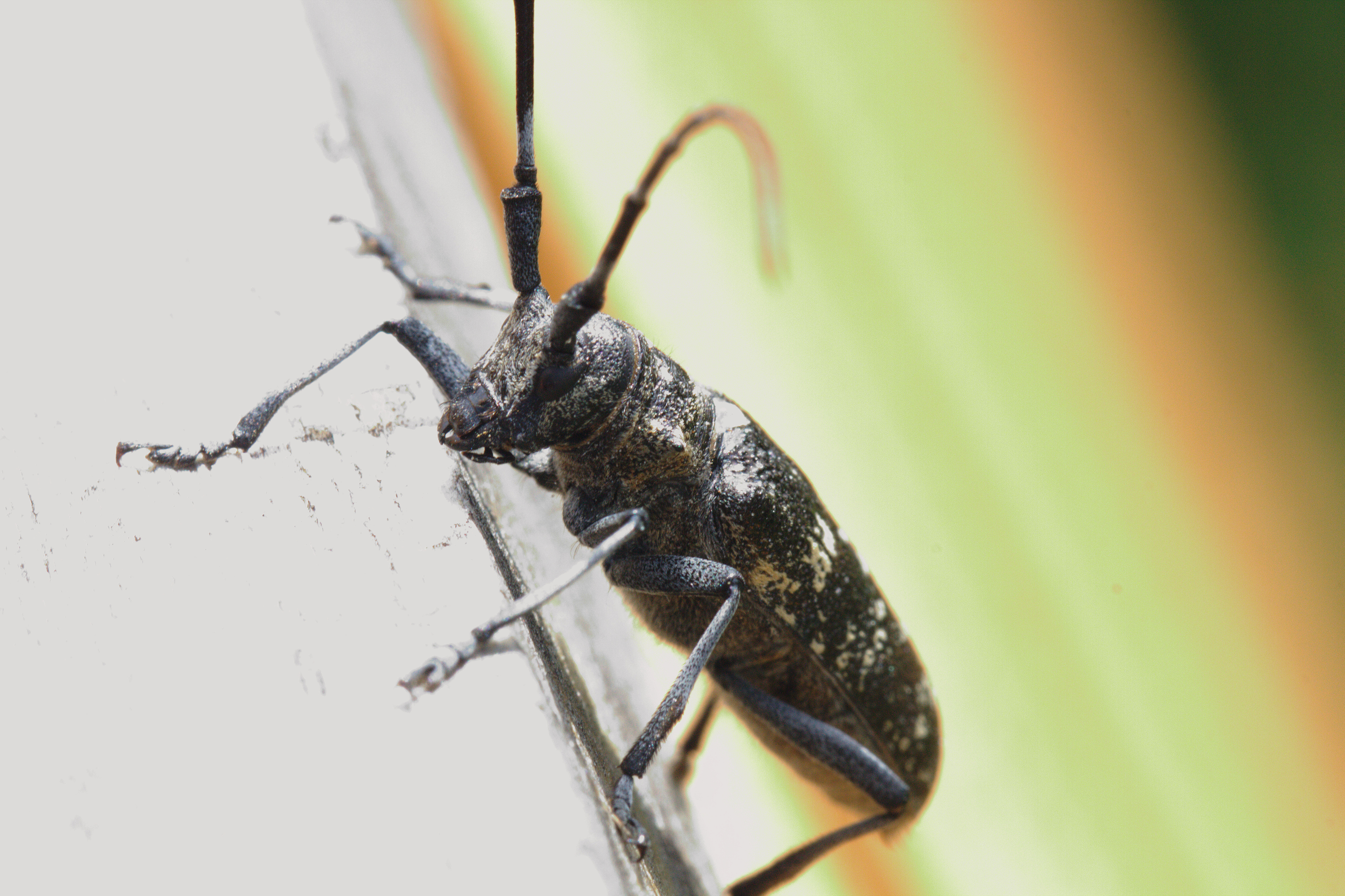

Scientific classification
- Kingdom: Animalia
- Phylum: Arthropoda
- Class: Insecta
- Order: Coleoptera
- Suborder: Polyphaga
- Infraorder: Cucujiformia
- Family: Cerambycidae
- Genus: Monochamus
- Species: M. sutor

Binomial name
- Monochamus sutor (Linnaeus, 1758)

Synonyms
- Cerambyx sutor Linnaeus, 1758; Lamia sutor (Linnaeus, 1758); Cerambyx atomarius DeGeer, 1775; Cerambyx anglicus Voet, 1778 (Unav.); Lamia heinrothi Caderhjielm, 1798; Lamia rosenmülleri Caderhjielm, 1798; Lamia pellio Germar, 1818; Monohammus obscurior Abeille de Perrin, 1869

= Monochamus sutor =

Species of beetle

Monochamus sutor is a species of beetle in the family Cerambycidae. It was described by Carl Linnaeus in 1758, originally under the genus Cerambyx. It has a wide, natural distribution throughout Europe, and has also been introduced into Belgium and the Netherlands. Adults measure between 15 and 24 mm (0.59 and 0.94 in), and larvae measure up to 45 mm (1.8 in).

== Subspecies ==
- Monochamus sutor longulus Pic, 1898
- Monochamus sutor sutor (Linnaeus, 1758)
