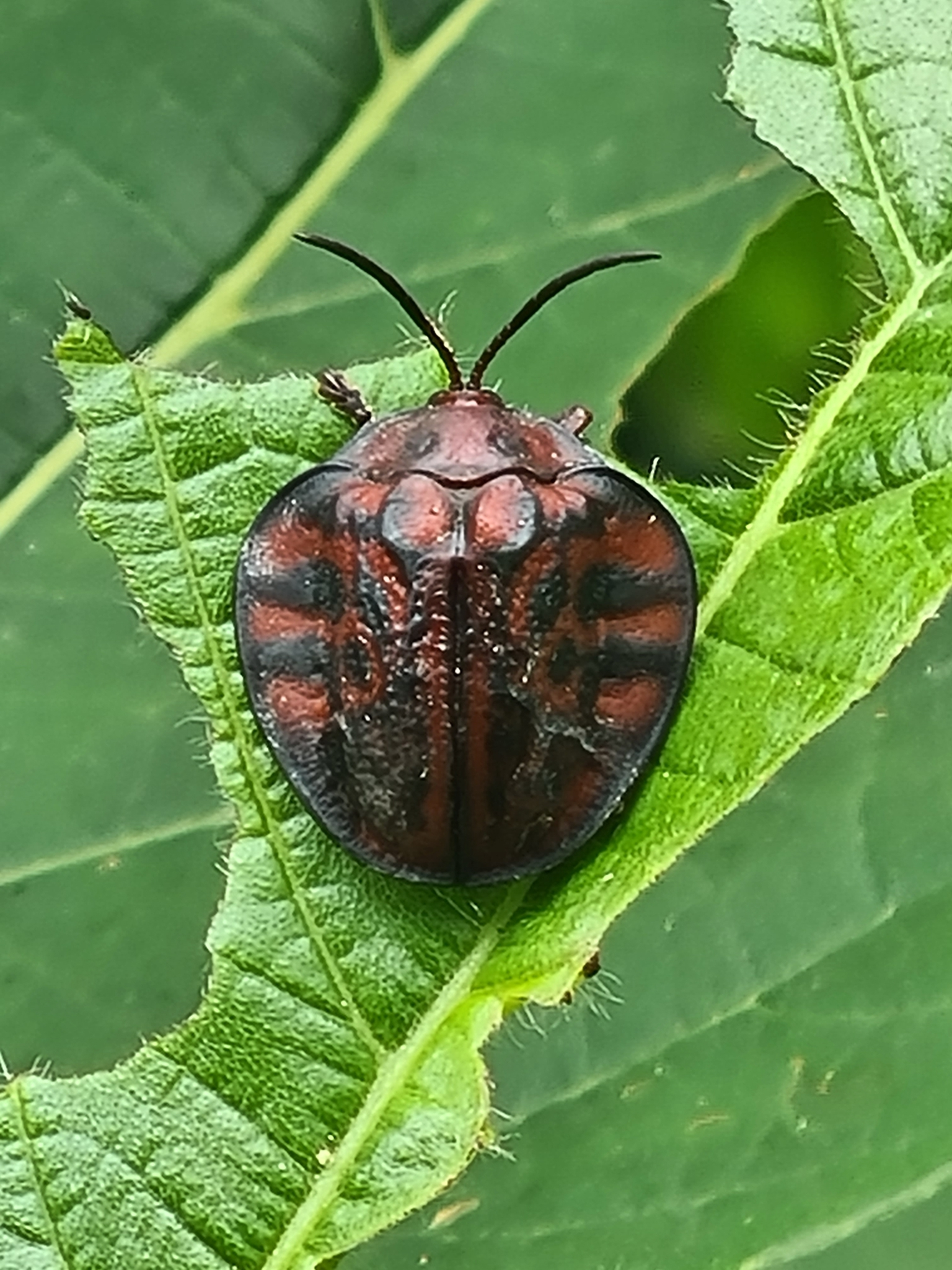

Scientific classification
- Kingdom: Animalia
- Phylum: Arthropoda
- Class: Insecta
- Order: Coleoptera
- Suborder: Polyphaga
- Infraorder: Cucujiformia
- Family: Chrysomelidae
- Genus: Discomorpha
- Species: D. variegata

Binomial name
- Discomorpha variegata (Linnaeus, 1758)

= Discomorpha variegata =

Species of beetle

Discomorpha variegata is a tortoise beetle from the genus Discomorpha.

== Range ==
Known distributions of the Discomorpha variegata are in Caribbean, French Guiana, Guyana and Suriname.
