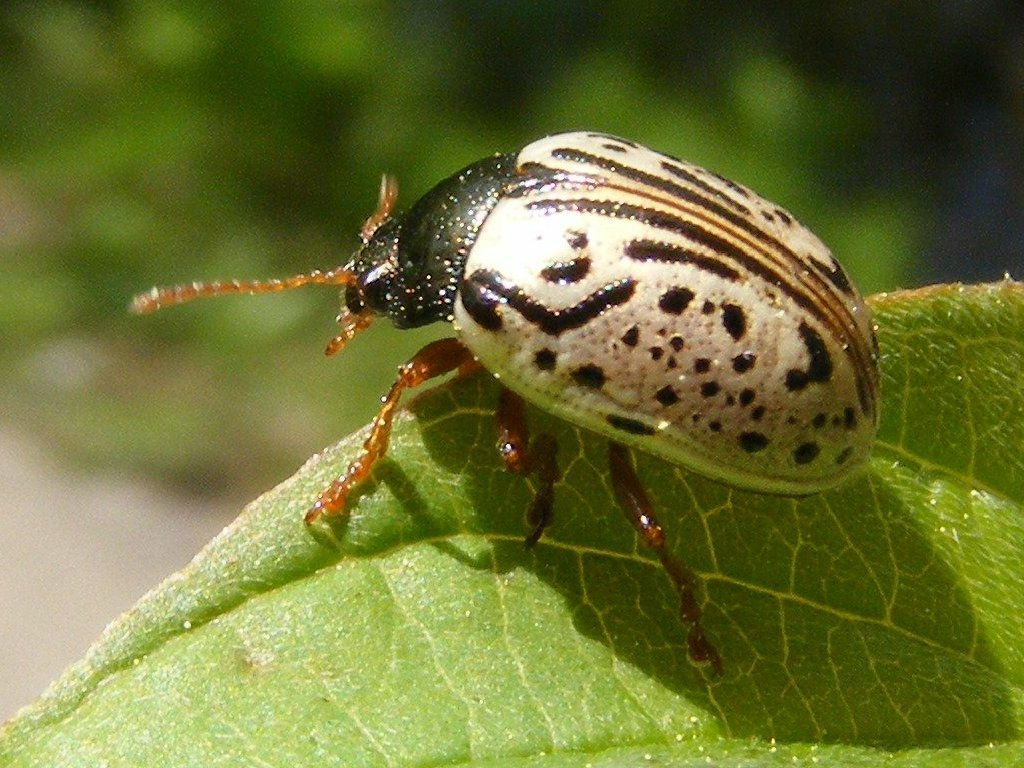

Scientific classification
- Kingdom: Animalia
- Phylum: Arthropoda
- Clade: Pancrustacea
- Class: Insecta
- Order: Coleoptera
- Suborder: Polyphaga
- Infraorder: Cucujiformia
- Family: Chrysomelidae
- Genus: Calligrapha
- Species: C. philadelphica

Binomial name
- Calligrapha philadelphica (Linnaeus, 1758)

= Calligrapha philadelphica =

Species of beetle

Calligrapha philadelphica, known generally as the dogwood calligrapha or dogwood leaf beetle, is a species of leaf beetle in the family Chrysomelidae. It is found in North America.

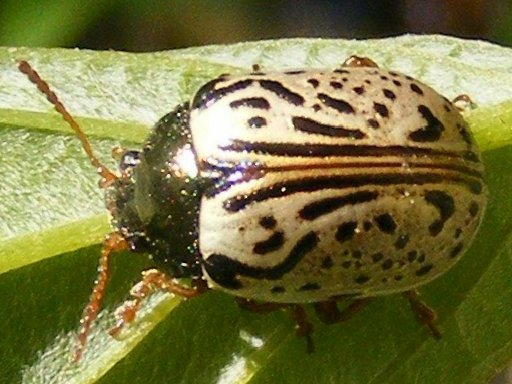
Dogwood calligrapha, Calligrapha philadelphica
