= Pycnodictya obscura =

Scientific classification
- Kingdom: Animalia
- Phylum: Arthropoda
- Clade: Pancrustacea
- Class: Insecta
- Order: Orthoptera
- Suborder: Caelifera
- Family: Acrididae
- Genus: Pycnodictya
- Species: P. obscura

Binomial name
- Pycnodictya obscura (Linnaeus, 1758)

Species of grasshopper

Pycnodictya obscura is a species of insect belonging to the family Acrididae.

It is native to Africa.
