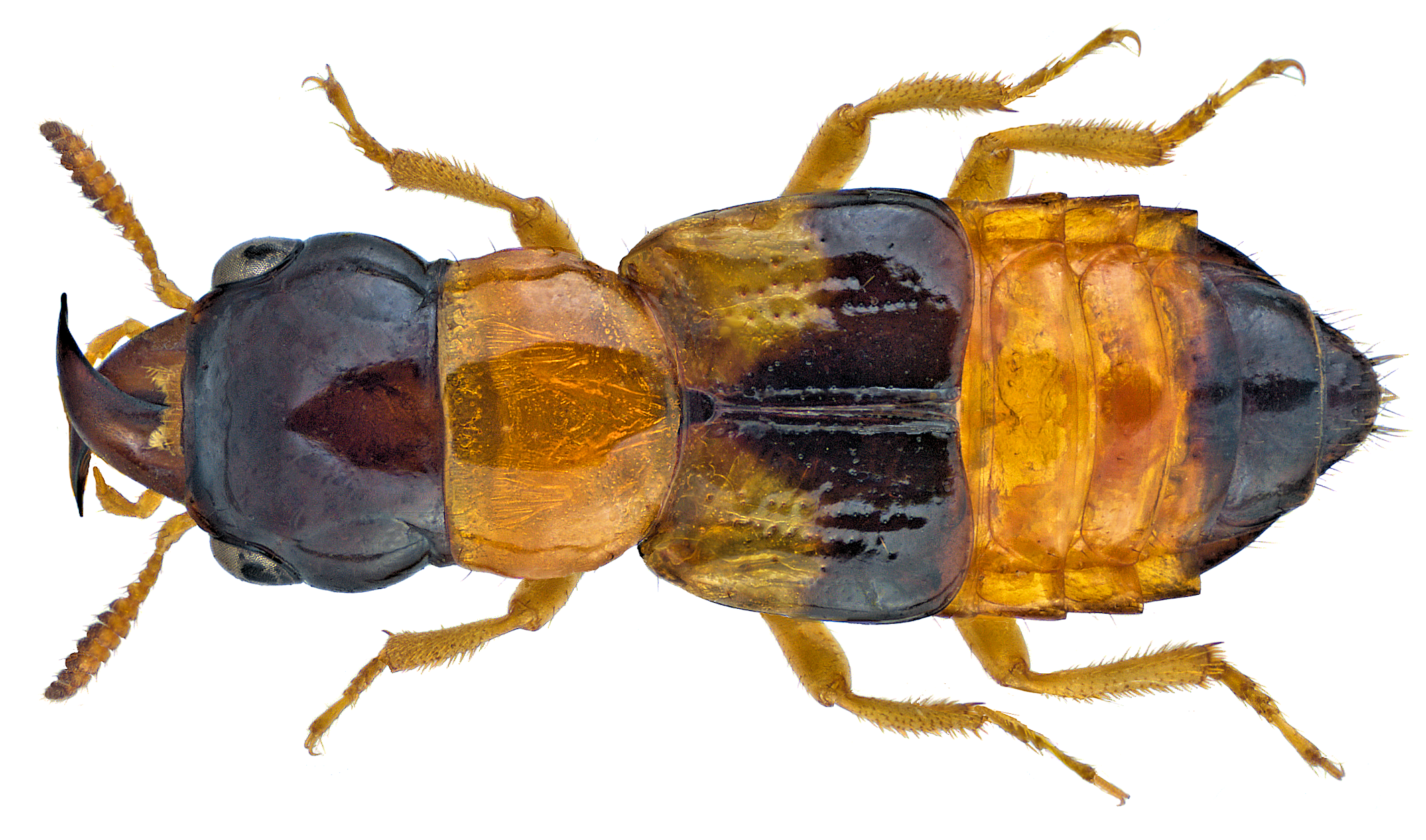
- Adult of Oxyporus rufus

Scientific classification
- Kingdom: Animalia
- Phylum: Arthropoda
- Class: Insecta
- Order: Coleoptera
- Suborder: Polyphaga
- Infraorder: Staphyliniformia
- Family: Staphylinidae
- Genus: Oxyporus
- Species: O. rufus

Binomial name
- Oxyporus rufus (Linnaeus, 1758)

= Oxyporus rufus =

Species of beetle

Oxyporus rufus is a species of beetle belonging to the large family of the rove beetles (Staphylinidae).

== Description ==
Oxyporus rufus is about 20 millimetres (0.8 in) long. The body is massive and wide, colored with black and orange. The imposing scimitar-like mandibles do not fall back close to the rest of the head. The head, the hind margin of the elytra, and the apex of the abdomen are black. The thorax, the visible segments of abdomen, and the first half of the very short elytra are orange. The antenna are orange as well, the last 7 segments being thicker and shorter forming a slight cob.

=== Similar species ===
A similar species is Oxyporus maxillosus, which elytra are yellow and only black at the hind corner.

=== Synonyme ===
- Oxyporus minarzi Author: Bernhauer, 1923
- Staphylinus nigrofulvus Author: Geoffroy, 1785
