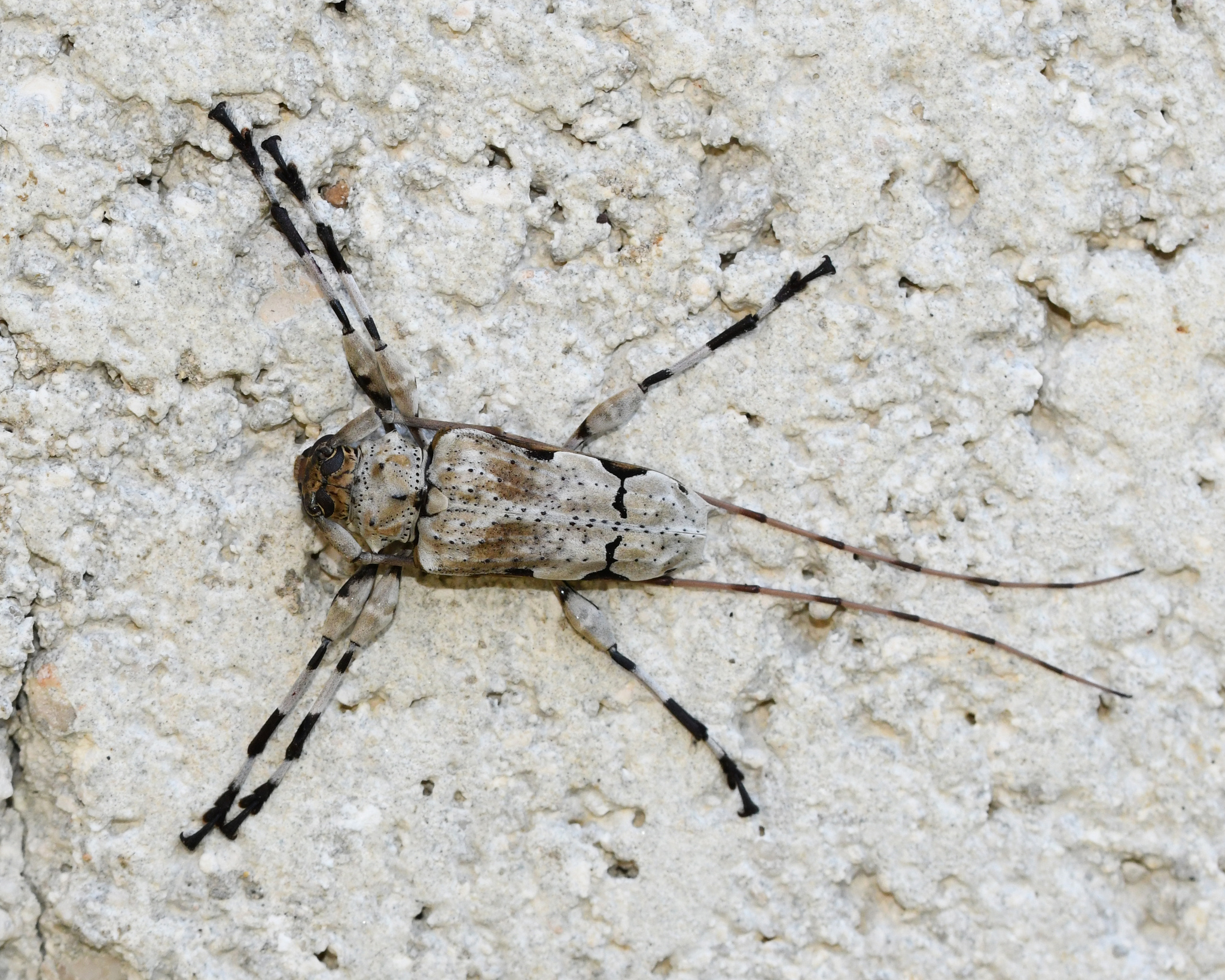
- Oreodera glauca, Dominican Republic

Scientific classification
- Kingdom: Animalia
- Phylum: Arthropoda
- Class: Insecta
- Order: Coleoptera
- Suborder: Polyphaga
- Infraorder: Cucujiformia
- Family: Cerambycidae
- Subfamily: Lamiinae
- Tribe: Acrocinini
- Genus: Oreodera
- Species: O. glauca

Binomial name
- Oreodera glauca (Linnaeus, 1758)

Synonyms
- Cerambyx glaucus Linné, 1758; Cerambyx tuberculatus Degeer, 1775; Cerambyx spengleri Fabricius, 1776; Cerambyx punctatus Voet, 1781; Lamia scabra Fabricius, 1793; Lamia rudis Olivier, 1797; Cerambyx literatus Donovan, 1813

= Oreodera glauca =

Species of beetle

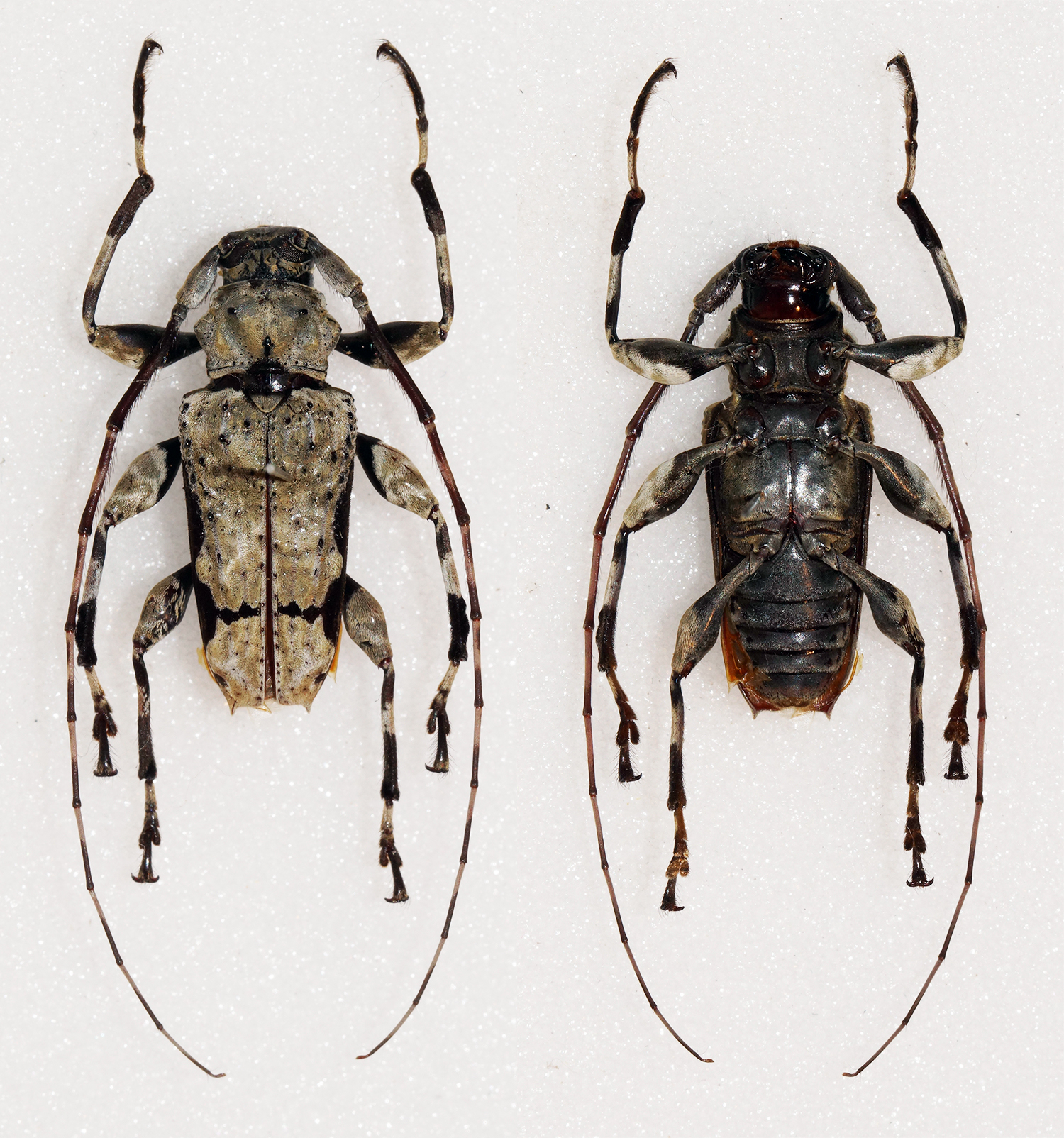

Oreodera glauca is a species of beetle in the family Cerambycidae, found in the Neotropics. It was described by Carl Linnaeus in his landmark 1758 10th edition of Systema Naturae. Larvae cut into the sapwood of their host plants prior to pupation. Adults rest with their antennae pressed flat against their body so that the abdomen looks like the beetle's head and vice versa.

== Subspecies ==
- Oreodera glauca glauca (Mexico, Guatemala, Honduras, Nicaragua, Costa Rica, Panama, Haiti, Dominican Republic, Dominica, Guadeloupe, Jamaica, Puerto Rico, Bahamas, St. Lucia, Cayman Islands, Colombia, Venezuela, Surinam, French Guiana, Guyana, Brazil, Bolivia, Paraguay, Argentina, Uruguay, Peru)
- Oreodera glauca jamaicensis Fisher, 1942 (Jamaica)
- Oreodera glauca pacifica Chemsak & Linsley, 1978 (Mexico: Socorro Island, Revilla Gigedo Islands)
