= List of Cantharis species =

This is a list of 95 species in Cantharis, a genus of soldier beetles in the family Cantharidae.

- Cantharis allosensis Pic, 1924^{f}
- Cantharis alticola (LeConte, 1881)^{i g b}
- Cantharis aneba McKey-Fender, 1951^{i b}
- Cantharis annularis Menetriez, 1836^{f}
- Cantharis antennalis (Marseul, 1864)^{f}
- Cantharis ariasi (Mulsant, 1862)^{f}
- Cantharis assimilis Paykull, 1798^{f}
- Cantharis atrata (Marseul, 1864)^{f}
- Cantharis basithorax Pic, 1902^{f}
- Cantharis beckeri (Pic, 1902)^{f}
- Cantharis beta Fender, 1951^{i g}
- Cantharis brevicornis (Kiesenwetter, 1852)^{f}
- Cantharis brullei (Marseul, 1864)^{f}
- Cantharis cedricola Wittmer, 1971^{f}
- Cantharis cornix (Abeille de Perrin, 1869)^{f}
- Cantharis coronata Gyllenhal, 1808^{f}
- Cantharis corvina Moscardini, 1962^{f}
- Cantharis cretica Wittmer, 1971^{f}
- Cantharis cryptica Ashe, 1947^{f}
- Cantharis curtisi (Kirby in Richards, 1837)^{i}
- Cantharis cypria (Marseul, 1864)^{f}
- Cantharis darwiniana Sharp, 1867^{f}
- Cantharis decipiens Baudi, 1871^{f}
- Cantharis decolorans Brullé, 1832^{f}
- Cantharis delagrangei Delkeskamp, 1939^{f}
- Cantharis dissipata Gemminger, 1870^{f}
- Cantharis edentula Baudi, 1871^{f}
- Cantharis ephippigera (Brullé, 1832)^{f}
- Cantharis europea Pic, 1921^{f}
- Cantharis falzonii Fiori, 1914^{f}
- Cantharis fidelis (LeConte, 1851)^{i g b}
- Cantharis figurata Mannerheim, 1843^{g b f}
- Cantharis flavilabris Fallen, 1807^{f}
- Cantharis franciana Kiesenwetter, 1866^{f}
- Cantharis fusca Linnaeus, 1758^{f}
- Cantharis fuscipennis (Mulsant, 1862)^{f}
- Cantharis gemina Dahlgren, 1974^{f}
- Cantharis grandicollis (LeConte, 1851)^{i g b}
- Cantharis groehni Fanti, 2025
- Cantharis hellenica Heyden, 1883^{f}
- Cantharis ictaria Fiori, 1914^{f}
- Cantharis impressa (LeConte, 1851)^{i g}
- Cantharis inculta Gene, 1839^{f}
- Cantharis instabilis Kiesenwetter, 1866^{f}
- Cantharis italica Fiori, 1914^{f}
- Cantharis kervillei Pic, 1932^{f}
- Cantharis lateralis Linnaeus, 1758^{f}
- Cantharis lecontei Fall, 1936^{i g b}
- Cantharis liburnica Depoli, 1912^{f}
- Cantharis livida Linnaeus, 1758^{i g b f}
- Cantharis loweri Pic, 1906^{i g}
- Cantharis marginella (LeConte, 1851)^{i g}
- Cantharis merula Moscardini, 1862^{f}
- Cantharis michaeli Fanti & Pankowski, 2023
- Cantharis monacha Moscardini, 1862^{f}
- Cantharis montana Stierlin, 1889^{f}
- Cantharis morio Fabricius, 1792^{f}
- Cantharis navka Kazantsev & Perkovsky, 2026
- Cantharis nevadensis Pic, 1908^{f}
- Cantharis nigra (De Geer, 1774)^{f}
- Cantharis nigricans Muller, 1766^{f}
- Cantharis nigriceps^{b}
- Cantharis nigricornis (Laporte de Castelnau, 1840)^{f}
- Cantharis obscura Linnaeus, 1758^{f}
- Cantharis ochreata (Reiche, 1878)^{f}
- Cantharis oregona (LeConte, 1866)^{i g b}
- Cantharis pagana Rosenhauer, 1847^{f}
- Cantharis paganettii (Flach, 1907)^{f}
- Cantharis palliata Gyllenhal, 1808^{f}
- Cantharis pallida Goeze, 1777^{f}
- Cantharis paludosa Fallen, 1807^{f}
- Cantharis paradoxa Hicker, 1960^{f}
- Cantharis paulinoi Kiesenwetter, 1870^{f}
- Cantharis pellucida Fabricius, 1792^{f}
- Cantharis peninsularis Fiori, 1914^{f}
- Cantharis pilsbryi Skinner, 1906^{i g}
- Cantharis praecox Gene, 1836^{f}
- Cantharis prusiensis (Marseul, 1864)^{f}
- Cantharis pulicaria Fabricius, 1781^{f}
- Cantharis pyrenaea Pic, 1906^{f}
- Cantharis quadripunctata (Muller, 1776)^{f}
- Cantharis reichei Mulsant, 1862^{f}
- Cantharis rufa Linnaeus, 1758^{i g b f}
- Cantharis rustica Fallen, 1807^{f}
- Cantharis schrammi Pic, 1907^{f}
- Cantharis seidlitzi Kiesenwetter, 1865^{f}
- Cantharis sicula Pic, 1906^{f}
- Cantharis simpliunguis (Blatchley, 1910)^{i g}
- Cantharis smyrnensis (Marseul, 1864)^{f}
- Cantharis terminata Faldermann, 1835^{f}
- Cantharis torretasoi Wittmer, 1935^{f}
- Cantharis transmarina (Motschulsky, 1860)^{i b}
- Cantharis tristis Fabricius, 1797^{f}
- Cantharis tuberculata (LeConte, 1851)^{i g b}
- Cantharis versicolor (Baudi, 1871)^{f}
- Cantharis vittata Fabricius, 1792^{i g}
- Cantharis westwoodi (Kirby in Richards, 1837)^{i g}
- Cantharis xanthoporpa Kiesenwetter, 1860^{f}

Data sources: i = ITIS, c = Catalogue of Life, g = GBIF, b = Bugguide.net, f = Fauna Europaea
