= List of soldier beetle (Cantharidae) species recorded in Great Britain =

The following is a list of soldier beetle (family Cantharidae) species recorded in Great Britain. For other beetles, see List of beetle species recorded in Britain.

- Podabrus alpinus (Paykull, 1798)
- Ancistronycha abdominalis (Fabricius, 1798)
- Cantharis cryptica Ashe, 1947
- Cantharis decipiens Baudi, 1871
- Cantharis figurata Mannerheim, 1843
- Cantharis fusca Linnaeus, 1758
- Cantharis lateralis Linnaeus, 1758
- Cantharis livida Linnaeus, 1758
- Cantharis nigra (De Geer, 1774)
- Cantharis nigricans (O. F. Müller, 1776)
- Cantharis obscura Linnaeus, 1758
- Cantharis pallida Goeze, 1777
- Cantharis paludosa Fallén, 1807
- Cantharis pellucida Fabricius, 1792
- Cantharis rufa Linnaeus, 1758
- Cantharis rustica Fallén, 1807
- Cantharis thoracica (Olivier, 1790)
- Rhagonycha elongata (Fallén, 1807)
- Rhagonycha fulva (Scopoli, 1763)
- Rhagonycha lignosa (O. F. Müller, 1764)
- Rhagonycha limbata C. G. Thomson, 1864
- Rhagonycha lutea (O. F. Müller, 1764)
- Rhagonycha testacea (Linnaeus, 1758)
- Rhagonycha translucida (Krynicki, 1832)
- Silis ruficollis (Fabricius, 1775)
- Malthinus balteatus Suffrian, 1851
- Malthinus flaveolus (Herbst, 1786)
- Malthinus frontalis (Marsham, 1802)
- Malthinus seriepunctatus Kiesenwetter, 1852
- Malthodes crassicornis (Mäklin, 1846)
- Malthodes dispar (Germar, 1824)
- Malthodes fibulatus Kiesenwetter, 1852
- Malthodes flavoguttatus Kiesenwetter, 1852
- Malthodes fuscus (Waltl, 1838)
- Malthodes guttifer Kiesenwetter, 1852
- Malthodes lobatus Kiesenwetter, 1852
- Malthodes marginatus (Latreille, 1806)
- Malthodes maurus (Laporte, 1840)
- Malthodes minimus (Linnaeus, 1758)
- Malthodes mysticus Kiesenwetter, 1852
- Malthodes pumilus (Brébisson, 1835)
