= Cantharis lecontei =

Scientific classification
- Domain: Eukaryota
- Kingdom: Animalia
- Phylum: Arthropoda
- Class: Insecta
- Order: Coleoptera
- Suborder: Polyphaga
- Infraorder: Elateriformia
- Family: Cantharidae
- Genus: Cantharis
- Species: C. lecontei

Binomial name
- Cantharis lecontei Fall, 1936

Species of beetle

Cantharis lecontei is a species of soldier beetle in the family Cantharidae. It is found in North America.
