= Cantharis alticola =

Scientific classification
- Kingdom: Animalia
- Phylum: Arthropoda
- Class: Insecta
- Order: Coleoptera
- Suborder: Polyphaga
- Infraorder: Elateriformia
- Family: Cantharidae
- Genus: Cantharis
- Species: C. alticola

Binomial name
- Cantharis alticola (LeConte, 1881)

Species of beetle

Cantharis alticola is a species of soldier beetle in the family Cantharidae. It is found in North America.
