= Cantharis soeulensis =

Scientific classification
- Kingdom: Animalia
- Phylum: Arthropoda
- Clade: Pancrustacea
- Class: Insecta
- Order: Coleoptera
- Suborder: Polyphaga
- Infraorder: Elateriformia
- Family: Cantharidae
- Subfamily: Cantharinae
- Tribe: Cantharini
- Genus: Cantharis
- Species: C. soeulensis

Binomial name
- Cantharis soeulensis Pic, 1922

Synonyms
- Cantharis (Cantharis) soeulensis Pic, 1922; Cantharis oedemeroides Kiesenwetter, 1874; Cantharis seoulensis

Species of soldier beetle

Cantharis soeulensis is a species of beetle in the Cantharidae family. It was first described in 1922 by Maurice Pic. The species epithet, soeulensis, describes the beetle as being found in Seoul.

It is found in South Korea, in Gangwon-do, Gyeonggi-do, Gyeongsangbuk-do, and Chungcheongnam-do.
