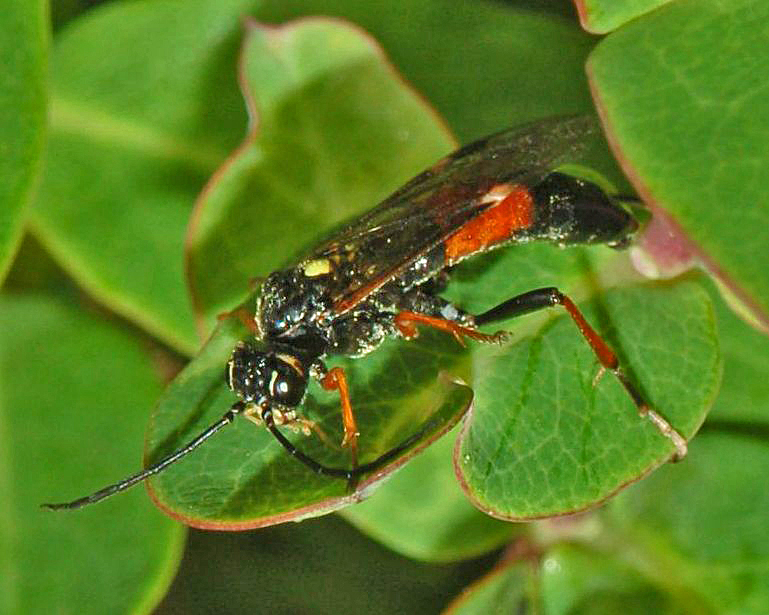
- Tenthredopsis scutellaris

Scientific classification
- Domain: Eukaryota
- Kingdom: Animalia
- Phylum: Arthropoda
- Class: Insecta
- Order: Hymenoptera
- Suborder: Symphyta
- Family: Tenthredinidae
- Subfamily: Tenthredininae
- Tribe: Tenthredopsini
- Genus: Tenthredopsis; Costa, 1859

= Tenthredopsis =

Genus of sawflies

Tenthredopsis is a genus of common sawflies belonging to the family Tenthredinidae subfamily Tenthrediniinae. These sawflies are present in most of Europe.

== Species ==
- Tenthredopsis albonotata (Brullé, 1832)
- Tenthredopsis annuligera (Tischbein, 1846)
- Tenthredopsis auriculata C. G. Thomson, 1870
- Tenthredopsis balcana (Mocsáry, 1880)
- Tenthredopsis benthini Rudow, 1871
- Tenthredopsis cabrerae Konow, 1898
- Tenthredopsis carinata Malaise, 1931
- Tenthredopsis coquebertii (Klug, 1817)
- Tenthredopsis corcyrensis (Ed. André, 1881)
- Tenthredopsis crassiuscula A. Costa, 1894
- Tenthredopsis floricola Costa, 1859
- Tenthredopsis friesei Konow, 1887
- Tenthredopsis hungarica (Klug, 1814)
- Tenthredopsis kokuewi Jakovlev, 1891
- Tenthredopsis lactiflua (Klug, 1814)
- Tenthredopsis ligata Konow, 1903
- Tenthredopsis litterata (Geoffroy, 1785)
- Tenthredopsis macedonica Cingovski, 1958
- Tenthredopsis moscovita (Ed. André, 1881)
- Tenthredopsis nassata (Linnaeus, 1767)
- Tenthredopsis nebrodensis A. Costa, 1894
- Tenthredopsis nigella Konow, 1891
- Tenthredopsis nivosa (Klug, 1817)
- Tenthredopsis ornata (Serville, 1823)
- Tenthredopsis ornatrix Konow, 1890
- Tenthredopsis putoni Konow, 1886
- Tenthredopsis quadriforis Konow, 1898
- Tenthredopsis quadriguttata A. Costa, 1859
- Tenthredopsis romana Konow, 1894
- Tenthredopsis scutellaris (Fabricius, 1798)
- Tenthredopsis semirufa Kriechbaumer, 1884
- Tenthredopsis sordida (Klug, 1814)
- Tenthredopsis stigma (Fabricius, 1798)
- Tenthredopsis tarsata (Fabricius, 1804)
- Tenthredopsis tessellata (Klug, 1817)
- Tenthredopsis tischbeinii (Frivaldszky, 1876)

== Gallery ==
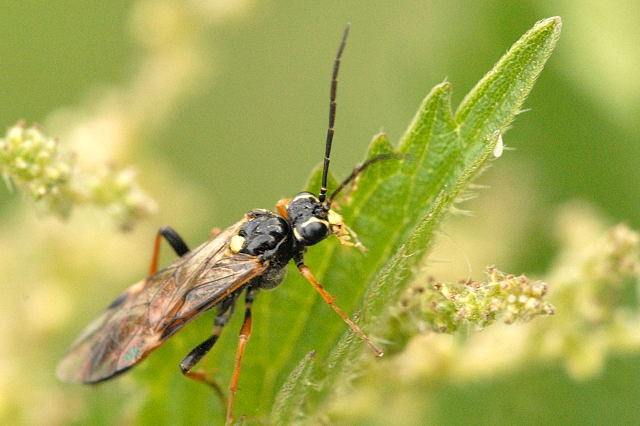
Tenthredopsis coquebertii

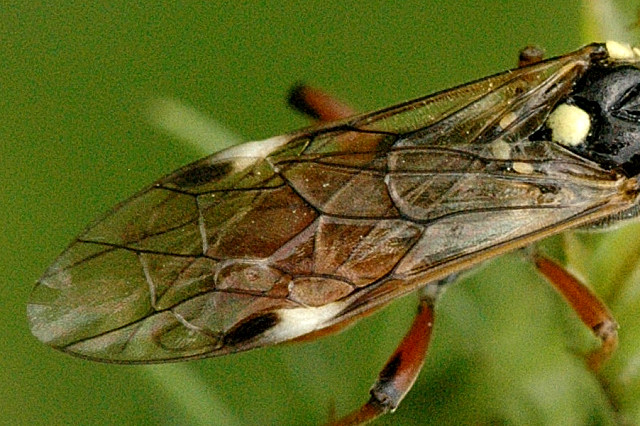
Tenthredopsis litterata

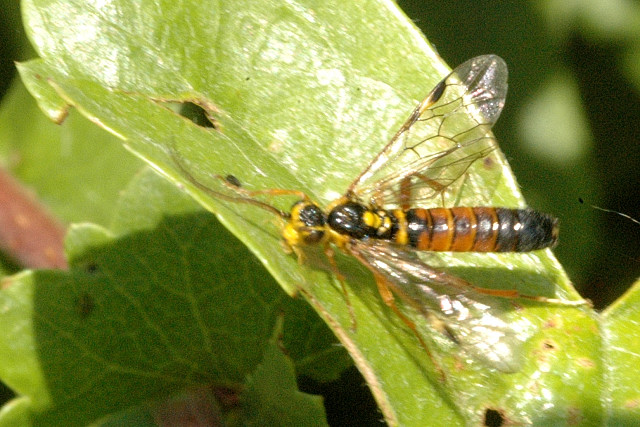
Tenthredopsis nassata

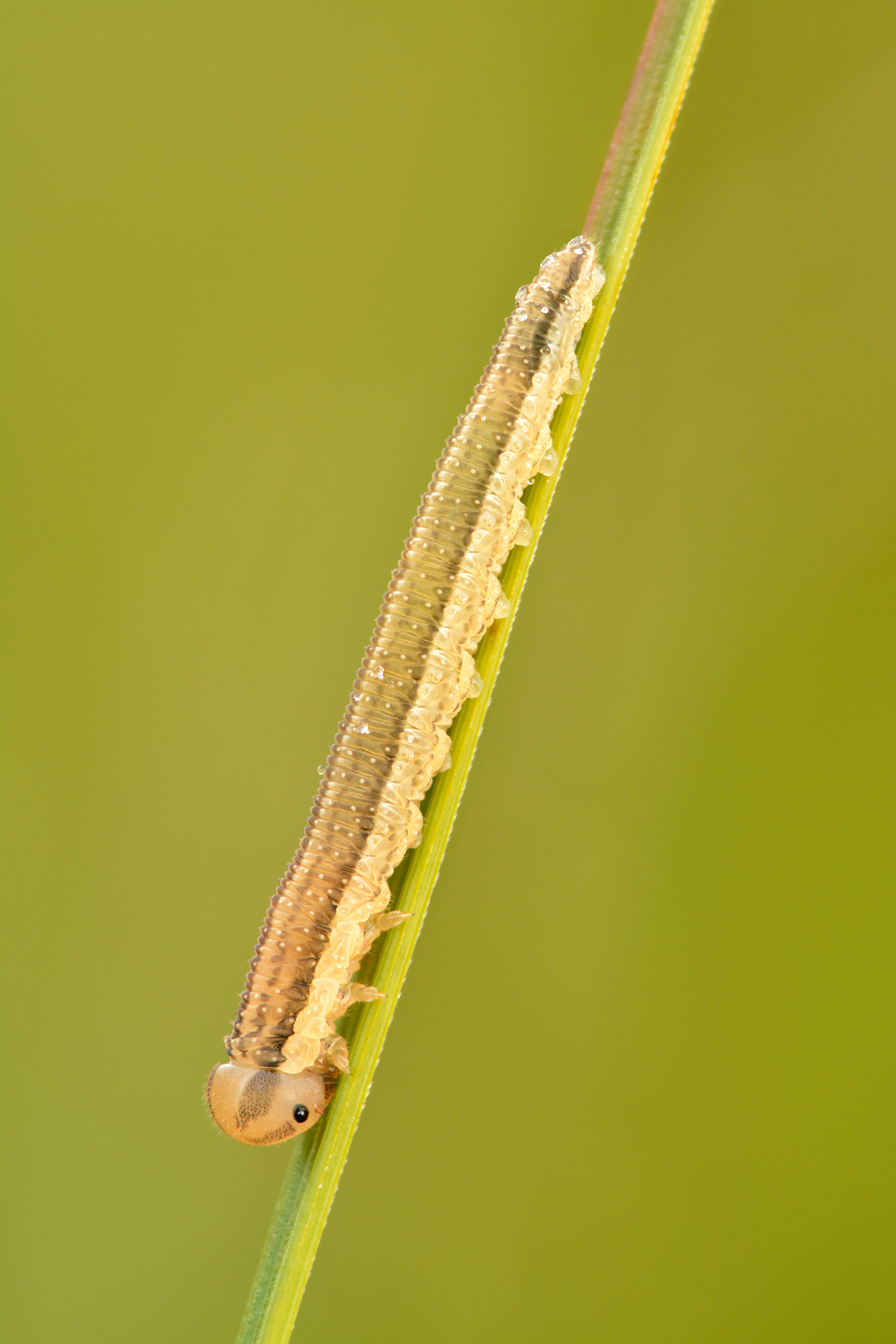
Larva

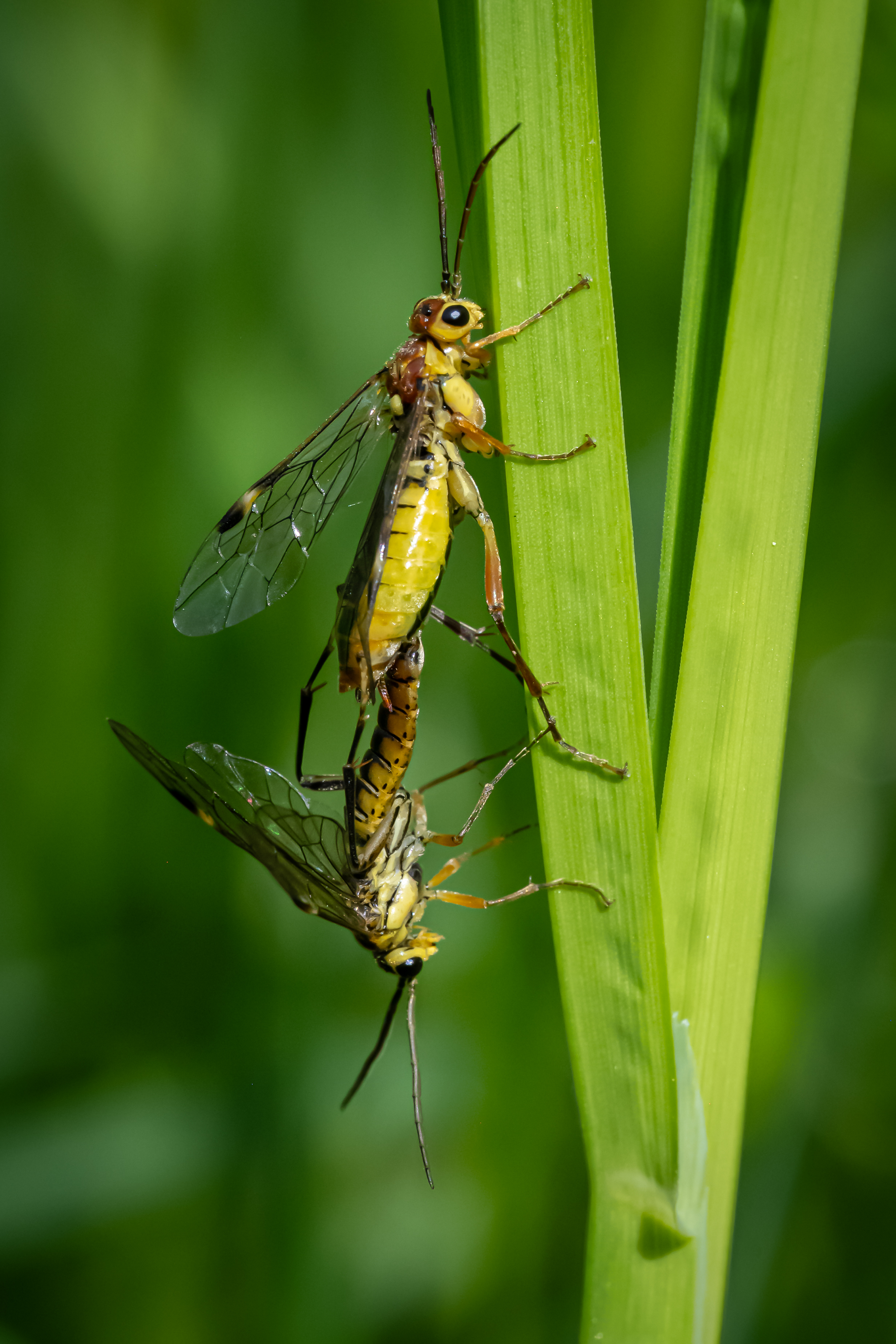
Tenthredopsis sp., copula
