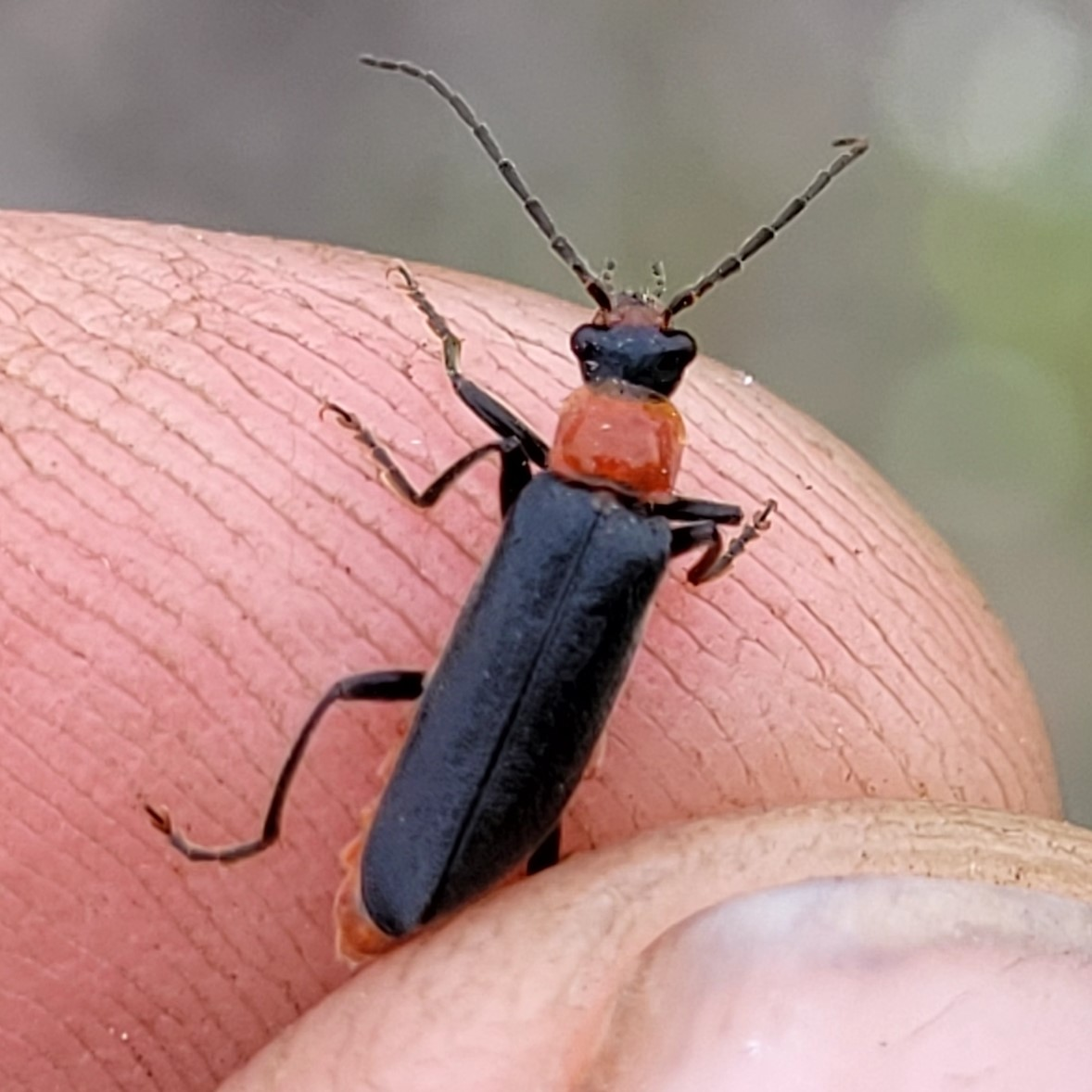

Scientific classification
- Kingdom: Animalia
- Phylum: Arthropoda
- Class: Insecta
- Order: Coleoptera
- Suborder: Polyphaga
- Infraorder: Elateriformia
- Family: Cantharidae
- Genus: Cantharis
- Species: C. aneba

Binomial name
- Cantharis aneba McKey-Fender, 1951

= Cantharis aneba =

Species of beetle

Cantharis aneba is a species of soldier beetle in the family Cantharidae. It is found in North America.

== Subspecies ==
These two subspecies belong to the species Cantharis aneba:

- Cantharis aneba aneba
- Cantharis aneba borealis McKey-Fender, 1951
