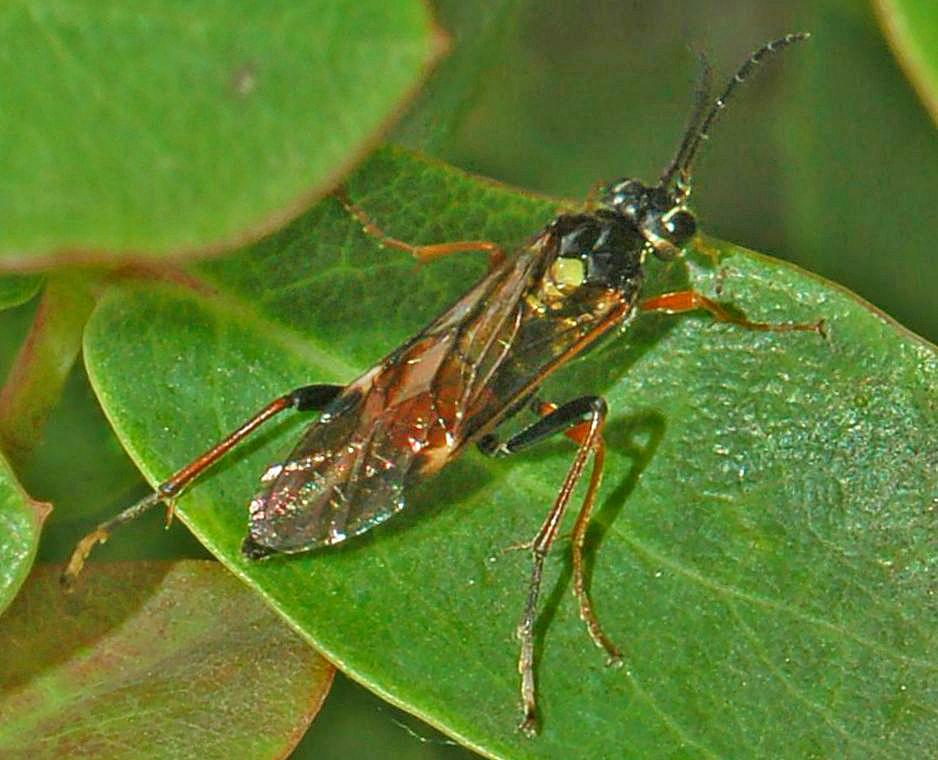
- Dorsal view
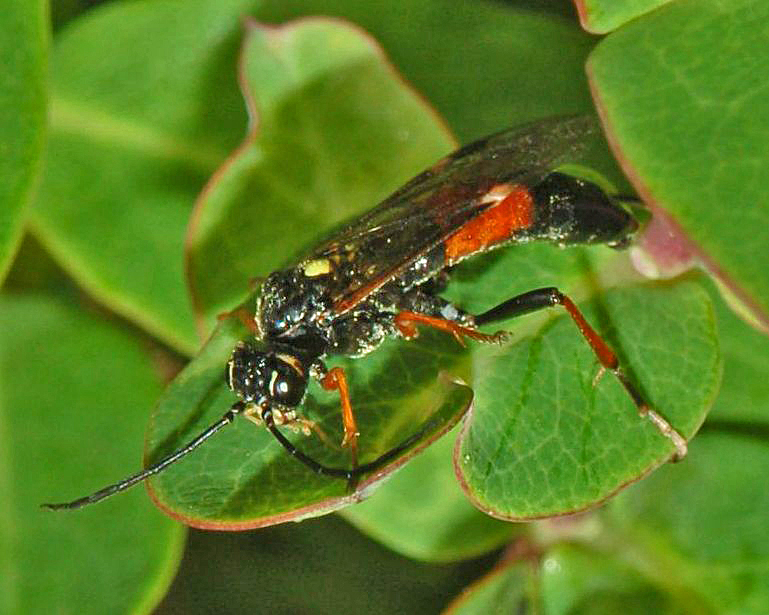
- Side view

Scientific classification
- Kingdom: Animalia
- Phylum: Arthropoda
- Class: Insecta
- Order: Hymenoptera
- Suborder: Symphyta
- Family: Tenthredinidae
- Genus: Tenthredopsis
- Species: T. scutellaris

Binomial name
- Tenthredopsis scutellaris (Fabricius, 1798)

Synonyms
- Tenthredopsis austriaca Konow, 1890; Tenthredopsis inornata Cameron, 1881; Tenthredopsis parvula Konow, 1890

= Tenthredopsis scutellaris =

Species of sawfly

Tenthredopsis scutellaris, a common sawfly, is a species of the family Tenthredinidae and subfamily Tenthrediniinae.

== Distribution ==
This species is mainly present in British Isles, France, Germany, Italy, Austria, Switzerland, Poland and Romania.

== Habitat ==
These sawflies mainly inhabit hedgerows, meadows, roadsides and forest edges

== Description ==
Adults of Tenthredopsis scutellaris can reach a length of 8.5–12 millimetres (0.33–0.47 in). Thorax is black, with a yellow stripe along the forehead and yellow scutellum and postscutellum. The legs are brown, but the hind legs are black. The wings are clear with brown veins. Sexual dimorphism is not conspicuous, but in males the rear thigh is rather light, while in the females it is dark. Moreover in the females the abdomen is black with a central broad red band.

== Biology ==
Adults of Tenthredopsis scutellaris can be encountered from May through June feeding on nectar and pollen of flowers of Apiaceae species (Heracleum sphondylium). The larvae are polyphagous on a variety of plants, especially on Apiaceae species (Anthriscus sylvestris) and on herbaceous plants (Poaceae species).
