= Cantharis transmarina =

Scientific classification
- Domain: Eukaryota
- Kingdom: Animalia
- Phylum: Arthropoda
- Class: Insecta
- Order: Coleoptera
- Suborder: Polyphaga
- Infraorder: Elateriformia
- Family: Cantharidae
- Genus: Cantharis
- Species: C. transmarina

Binomial name
- Cantharis transmarina (Motschulsky, 1860)

Species of beetle

Cantharis transmarina is a species of soldier beetle in the family Cantharidae. It is found in North America.

== Subspecies ==
These two subspecies belong to the species Cantharis transmarina:

- Cantharis transmarina scopa (LeConte, 1866)
- Cantharis transmarina transmarina (Motschulsky, 1860)
