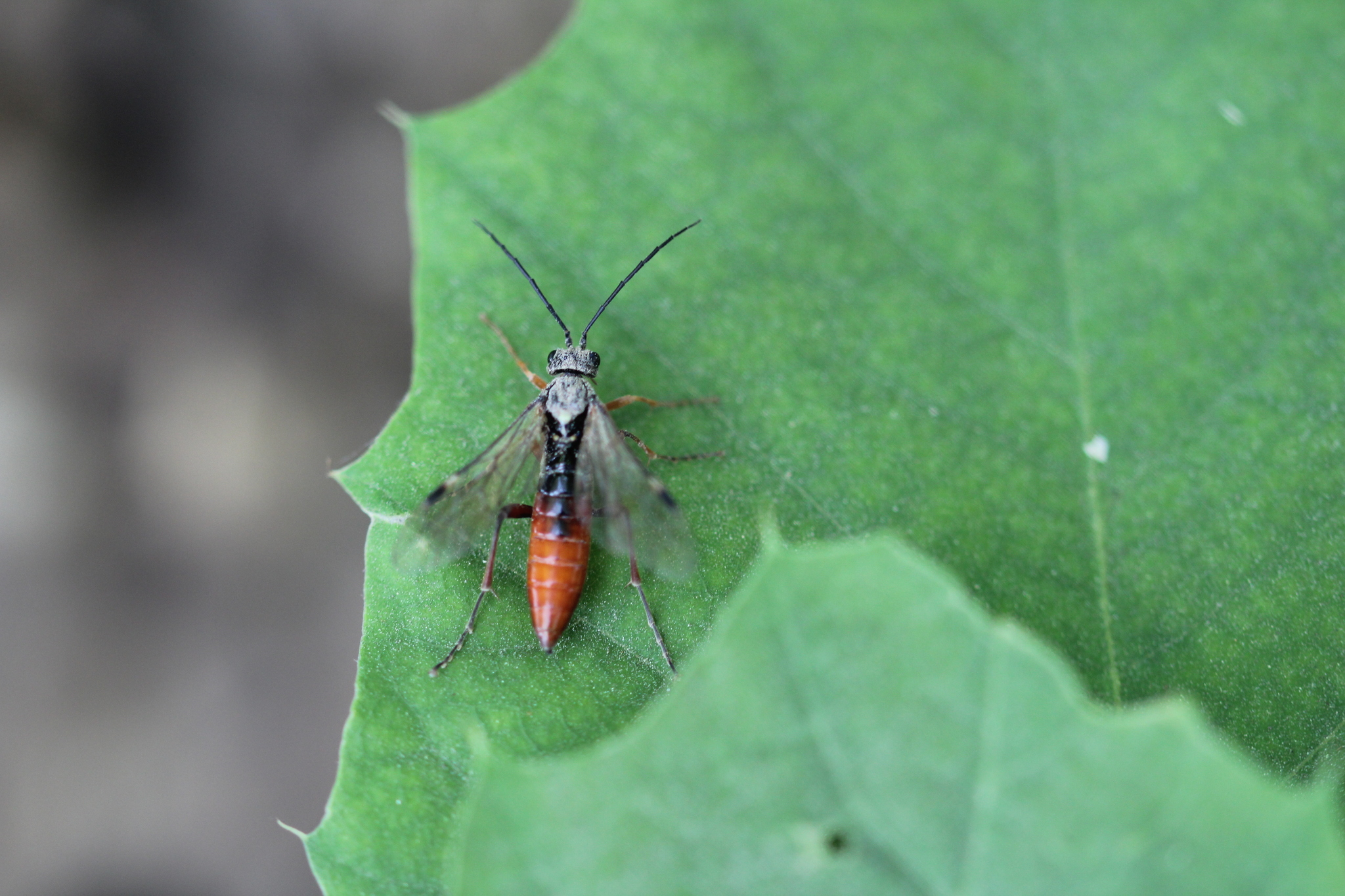

Scientific classification
- Domain: Eukaryota
- Kingdom: Animalia
- Phylum: Arthropoda
- Class: Insecta
- Order: Hymenoptera
- Suborder: Symphyta
- Family: Tenthredinidae
- Genus: Tenthredopsis
- (unranked): Tenthredopsis nassata complex
- Species: T. litterata

Binomial name
- Tenthredopsis litterata (Geoffroy, 1785)

= Tenthredopsis litterata =

Species of insect

Tenthredopsis litterata, also known by its common name large tenthredopsis, is a species of Sawfly from the Tenthredopsis nassata species complex. The species was originally described in 1785 by Étienne Geoffroy Saint-Hilaire.
