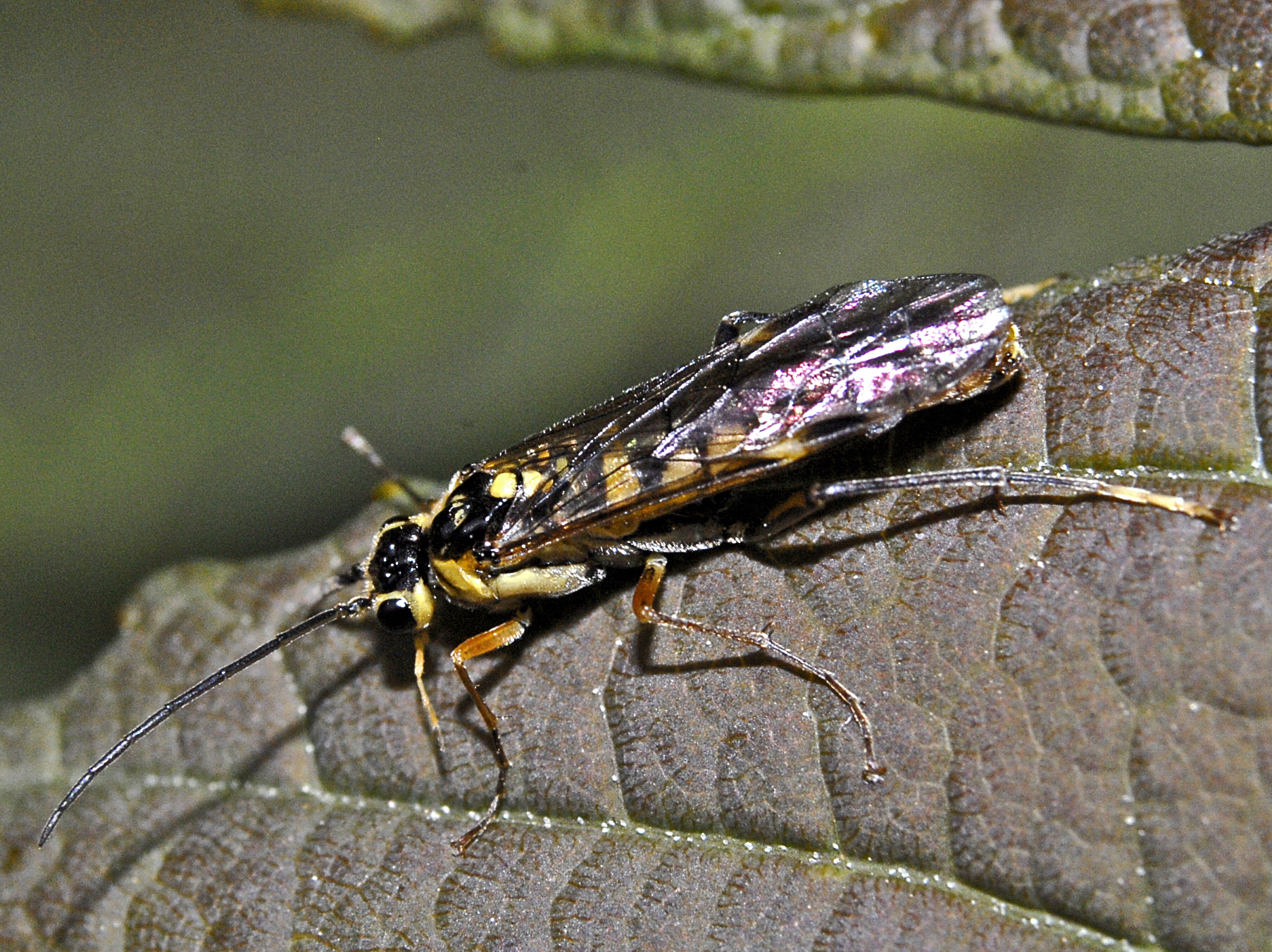
- Male of Tenthredopsis friesei

Scientific classification
- Kingdom: Animalia
- Phylum: Arthropoda
- Class: Insecta
- Order: Hymenoptera
- Suborder: Symphyta
- Family: Tenthredinidae
- Genus: Tenthredopsis
- Species: T. friesei

Binomial name
- Tenthredopsis friesei Konow, 1884

Synonyms
- Tenthredopsis arrogans Konow, 1890

= Tenthredopsis friesei =

Species of sawfly

Tenthredopsis friesei, the common sawfly, is a species belonging to the family Tenthredinidae.

== Description ==
Tenthredopsis friesei can reach a length of 10–11 millimetres (0.39–0.43 in) in males, of 9–12 millimetres (0.35–0.47 in) in females.

Adults can be encountered from May through June feeding on nectar and pollen. The larvae feed on Holcus mollis.

== Distribution ==
These sawflies are mainly present in Austria, Belgium, British Isles, Croatia, Czech Republic, Denmark, France, Germany, Italy, North Macedonia, Poland, Romania, Russia, Slovakia, Spain and Switzerland.
