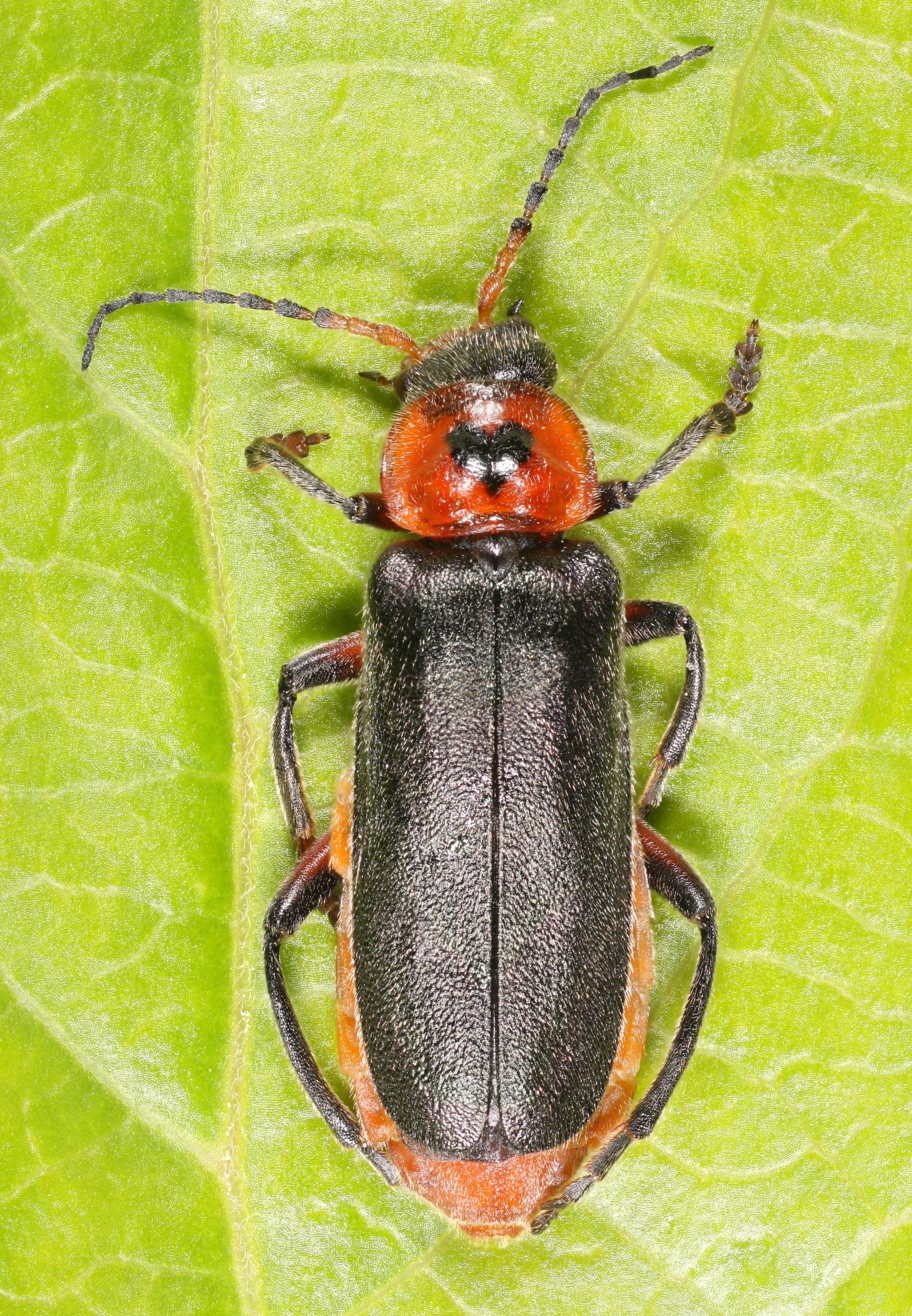

Scientific classification
- Domain: Eukaryota
- Kingdom: Animalia
- Phylum: Arthropoda
- Class: Insecta
- Order: Coleoptera
- Suborder: Polyphaga
- Infraorder: Elateriformia
- Family: Cantharidae
- Genus: Cantharis
- Species: C. rustica

Binomial name
- Cantharis rustica Fallén

= Cantharis rustica =

Species of soldier beetle

Cantharis rustica, the rustic sailor beetle, is a species of soldier beetle found from Europe to Central Russia.

== Description ==
C. rustica has black wing cases, which are protective covers for its wings. Its legs have a blackish color, and there is a heart-shaped spot on the pronotum. These features are unique for the species and can help identify this particular beetle.

In Central Europe, the adult beetles appear between May and July. Larvae are active from late summer until early spring, and in March and April they pupate.

C. rustica feeds on a wide range of species, including Sialis lutaria, Malachius bipustulatus, Adalia bipunctata, Phyllobius, Tenthredopsis litterata, Tenthredopsis nassata, Arge gracilicornis, Empis livida, Bibio marci, and Scatophaga stercoraria.

== Distribution ==
According to GBIF records, Cantharis rustica occurs in Europe from as north as Scandinavia to the shores of the Mediterranean Sea and from the Atlantic Ocean to Central Russia.

== Habitat ==
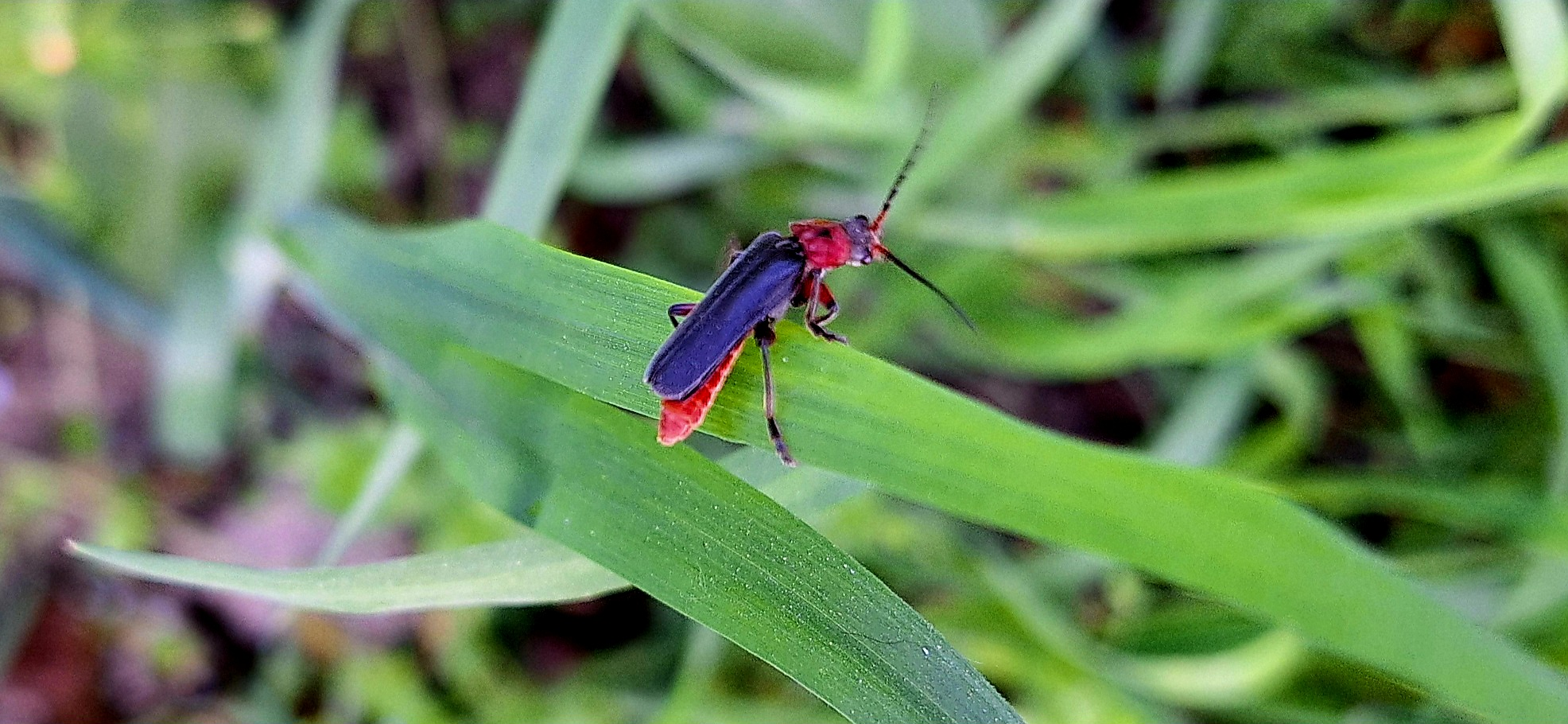
Cantharis rustica on a blade of grass

This beetle species has a preference for arable land, lowland grassland habitats, but it also occurs in woodland and other habitats with tall grass. Adults can be found on vegetation and flower heads from mid-May till the end of June.
