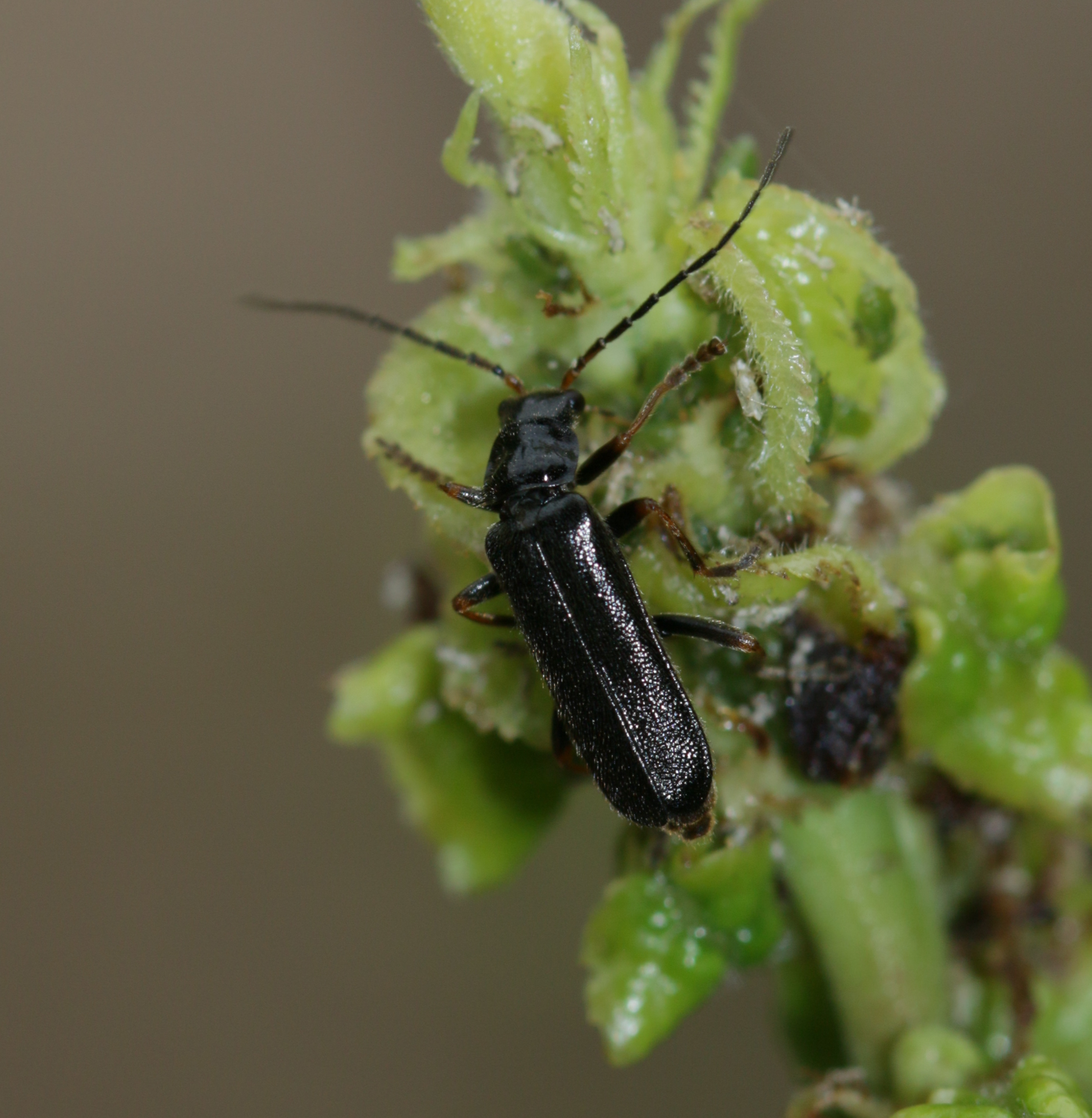
- Cantharis nigra Cumbria, England

Scientific classification
- Domain: Eukaryota
- Kingdom: Animalia
- Phylum: Arthropoda
- Class: Insecta
- Order: Coleoptera
- Suborder: Polyphaga
- Infraorder: Elateriformia
- Family: Cantharidae
- Genus: Cantharis
- Species: C. nigra

Binomial name
- Cantharis nigra (DeGeer, 1774)

= Cantharis nigra =

Species of beetle

Cantharis nigra is a species of soldier beetle native to Europe.
