= Cantharis obscura =

- Two Cantharis obscura specimens engaged in intercourse.

Scientific classification
- Kingdom: Animalia
- Phylum: Arthropoda
- Clade: Pancrustacea
- Class: Insecta
- Order: Coleoptera
- Suborder: Polyphaga
- Infraorder: Elateriformia
- Family: Cantharidae
- Genus: Cantharis
- Species: C. obscura

Binomial name
- Cantharis obscura Linnaeus, 1758

Synonyms
- Cantharis baudii Pic, 1909; Cantharis bicolor Fiori, 1899; Cantharis kaszabi Vosyka, 1957; Thelephorus obscurus (Linnaeus, 1758)

Species of beetle

Cantharis obscura is a species of beetle belonging to the family Cantharidae

== Description ==
Cantharis obscura

Cantharis obscura reaches a length of 9–13 millimetres (0.35–0.51 in). Elytra and head are black. Pronotum is black, with reddish or orange lateral margins. The adults feed on small insects, such as aphids, as well as on pollen of fruit trees.

== Distribution ==
This species can be found in most of Europe and in the eastern Palearctic realm.

== Habitat ==
These beetles live in bushes, edges of forests, and meadows.
