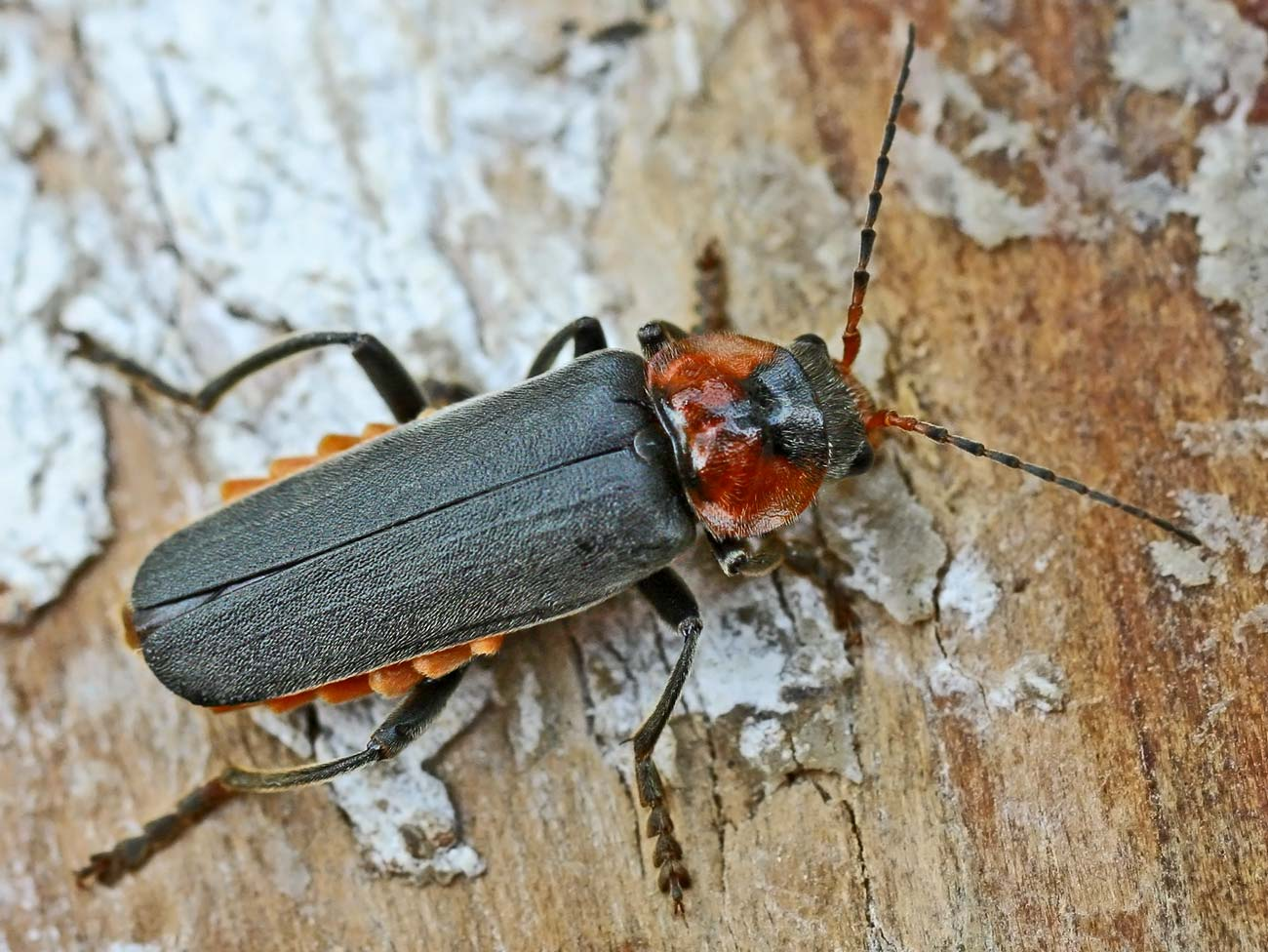

Scientific classification
- Kingdom: Animalia
- Phylum: Arthropoda
- Clade: Pancrustacea
- Class: Insecta
- Order: Coleoptera
- Suborder: Polyphaga
- Infraorder: Elateriformia
- Family: Cantharidae
- Genus: Cantharis
- Species: C. fusca

Binomial name
- Cantharis fusca Linnaeus, 1758

= Cantharis fusca =

Species of beetle

Cantharis fusca, the dark soldier beetle, is a species of soldier beetle.

Cantharis fusca reaches a length of 10–15 millimetres (0.39–0.59 in). Except for parts of the head and thorax, which are red or orange, this species is completely black. The body is flat and long, with weak exoskeleton. These beetles have long feathery antennae, and comparatively long legs.

This species is common in large parts of Europe, and lives in bushes, edges of forests, and meadows. They hunt for small insects.

The larvae have black hairs, and also eat small insects. They are very cold-resistant, and can be seen crawling on the snow in winter.

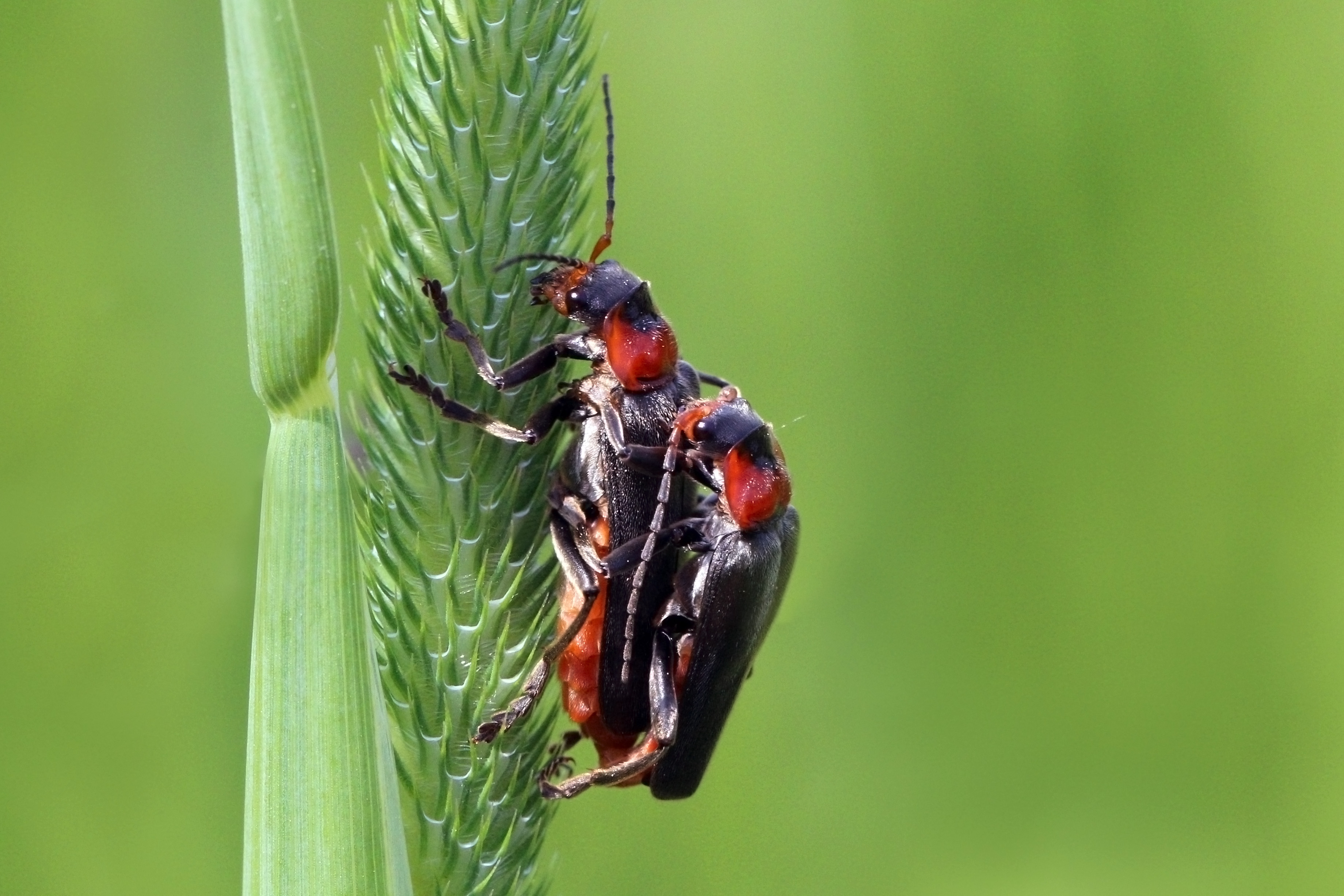
Mating

Mating
