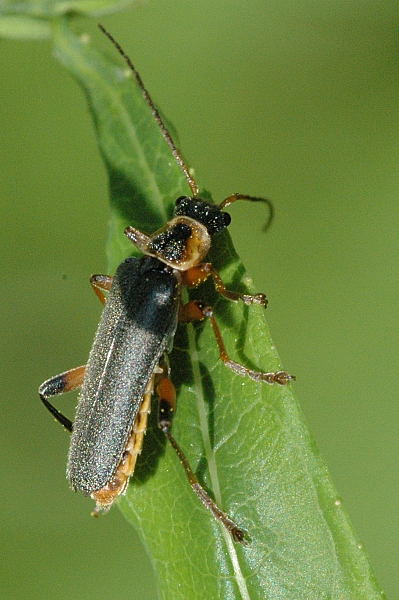
- Cantharis nigricans Ardennes, Belgium

Scientific classification
- Domain: Eukaryota
- Kingdom: Animalia
- Phylum: Arthropoda
- Class: Insecta
- Order: Coleoptera
- Suborder: Polyphaga
- Infraorder: Elateriformia
- Family: Cantharidae
- Genus: Cantharis
- Species: C. nigricans

Binomial name
- Cantharis nigricans (Müller, O.F 1776)

= Cantharis nigricans =

Species of beetle

Cantharis nigricans is a species of soldier beetle native to Europe.
