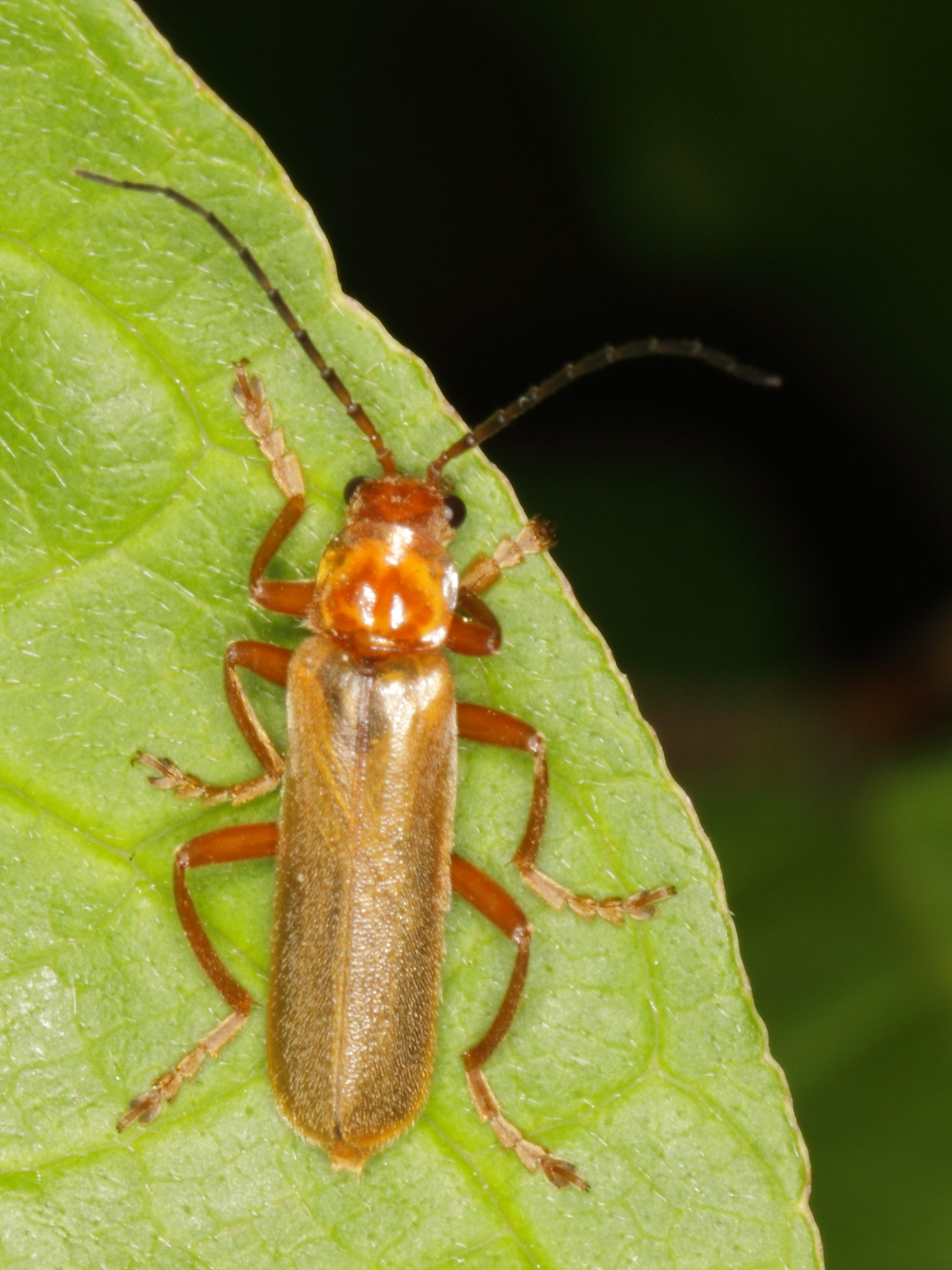
- Cantharis rufa Germany

Scientific classification
- Kingdom: Animalia
- Phylum: Arthropoda
- Class: Insecta
- Order: Coleoptera
- Suborder: Polyphaga
- Infraorder: Elateriformia
- Family: Cantharidae
- Genus: Cantharis
- Species: C. rufa

Binomial name
- Cantharis rufa (Linnaeus, 1758)

= Cantharis rufa =

Species of beetle

Cantharis rufa is a species of soldier beetles native to Europe.
