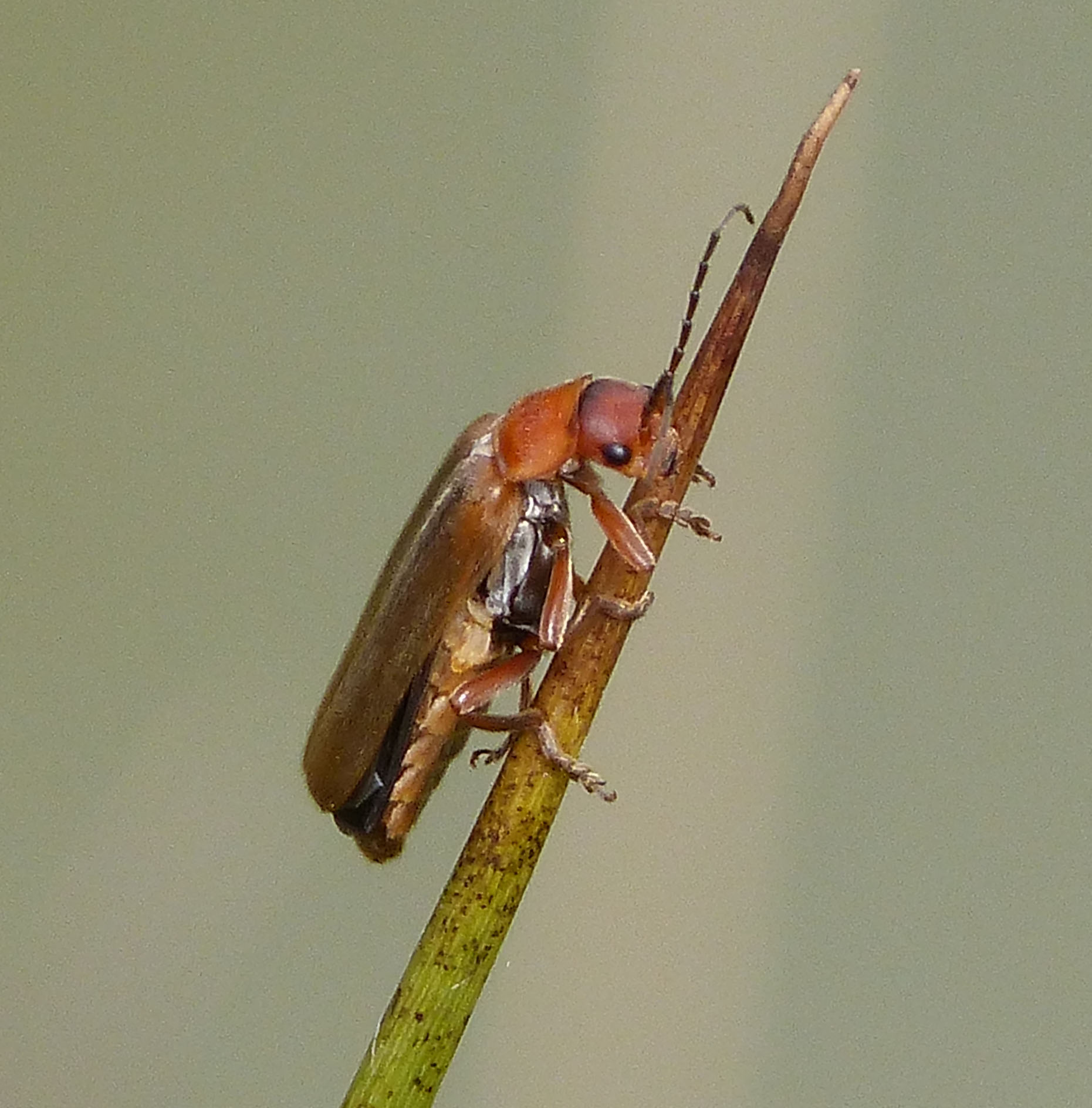
- Cantharis pallida England

Scientific classification
- Kingdom: Animalia
- Phylum: Arthropoda
- Clade: Pancrustacea
- Class: Insecta
- Order: Coleoptera
- Suborder: Polyphaga
- Infraorder: Elateriformia
- Family: Cantharidae
- Genus: Cantharis
- Species: C. pallida

Binomial name
- Cantharis pallida (Goeze, 1777)

= Cantharis pallida =

Species of beetle

Cantharis pallida is a species of soldier beetle native to Europe.
