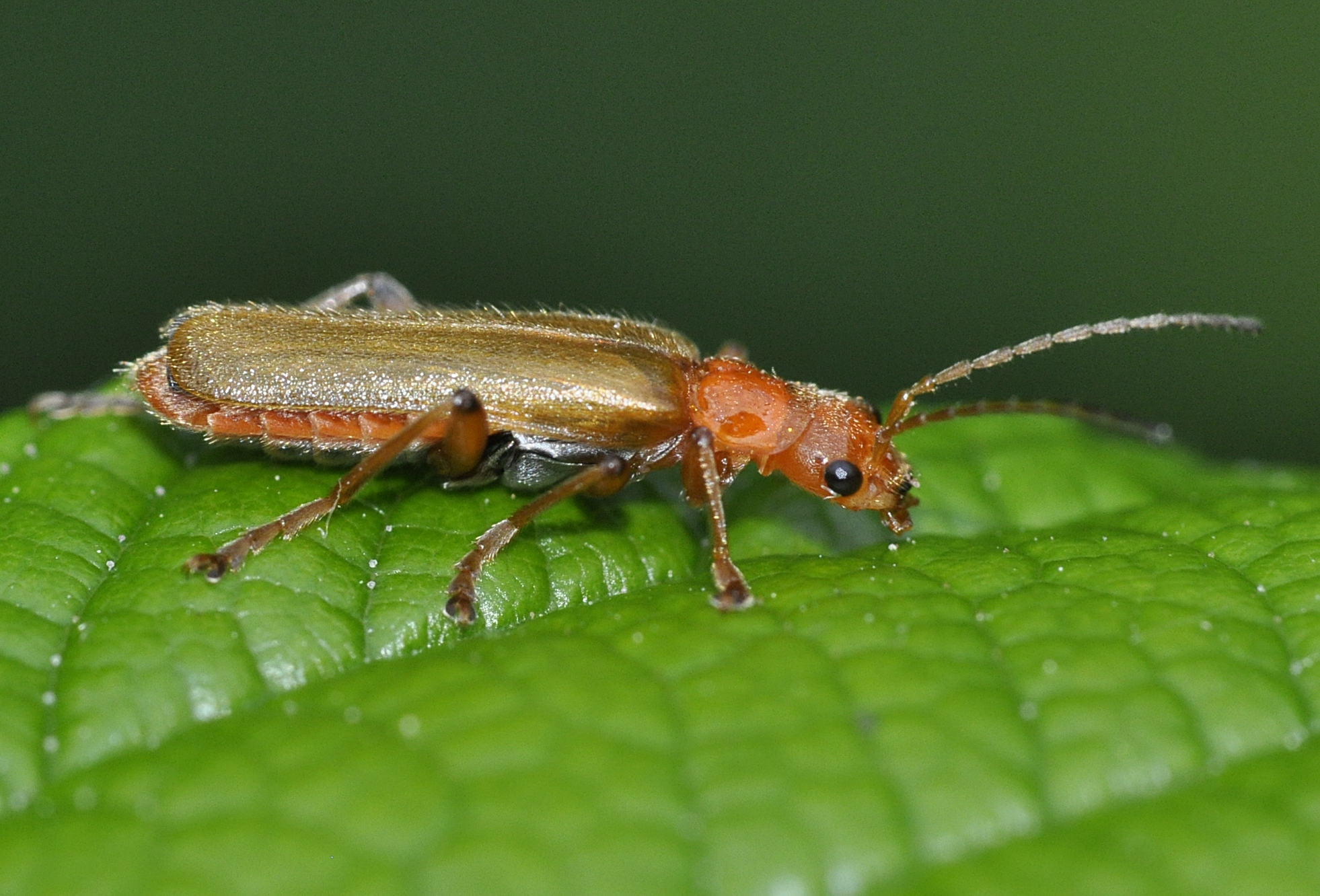
- Cantharis cryptica Germany

Scientific classification
- Domain: Eukaryota
- Kingdom: Animalia
- Phylum: Arthropoda
- Class: Insecta
- Order: Coleoptera
- Suborder: Polyphaga
- Infraorder: Elateriformia
- Family: Cantharidae
- Genus: Cantharis
- Species: C. cryptica

Binomial name
- Cantharis cryptica (Ashe, 1947)

= Cantharis cryptica =

Species of beetle

Cantharis cryptica is a species of soldier beetle native to Europe.
