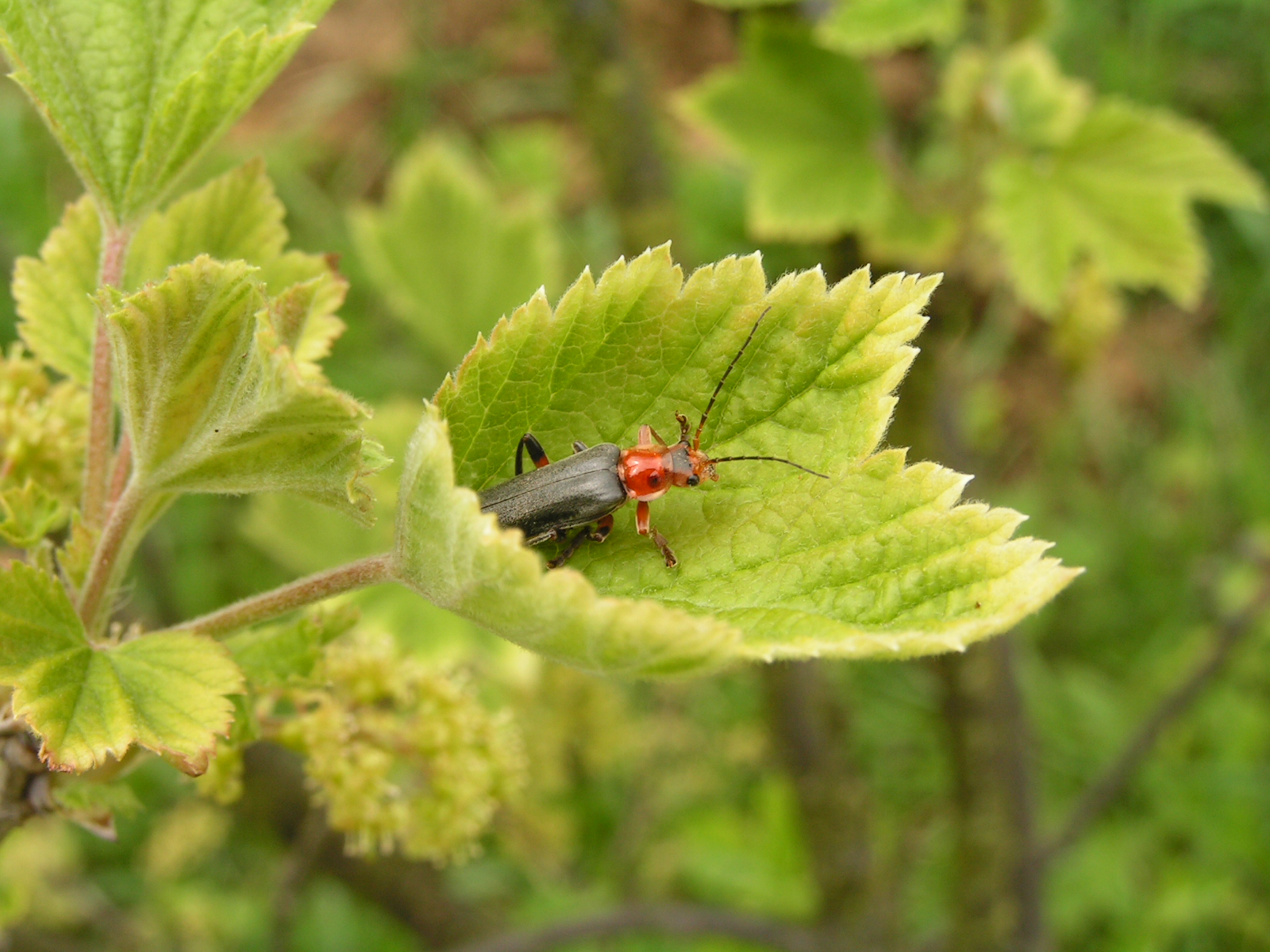

Scientific classification
- Kingdom: Animalia
- Phylum: Arthropoda
- Class: Insecta
- Order: Coleoptera
- Suborder: Polyphaga
- Infraorder: Elateriformia
- Family: Cantharidae
- Genus: Cantharis
- Species: C. livida

Binomial name
- Cantharis livida Linnaeus, 1758

Synonyms
- Cantharis hungarica Csiki, 1903

= Cantharis livida =

Species of beetle

Cantharis. livida on grass in a meadow

Cantharis livida, the pale soldier beetle, is a species of soldier beetle belonging to the genus Cantharis and the family Cantharidae.

== Description ==
Cantharis livida reaches a length of 10–15 millimetres (0.39–0.59 in). The body of this species is flat and long, with a weak exoskeleton. The colour is quite variable, depending on the subspecies. Elytra are usually yellow or reddish-brown, but in the subspecies rufipes they are black or dark brown. The head, the thorax, the abdomen are bright red or orange. The long antennae are reddish, with darker tips. The legs are reddish, with brownish tarsi.

These soldier beetles can be found on flowers, trees and shrubs from May to July, hunting for small insects. Also the larvae are predators, feeding on snails and earthworms.

== Distribution ==
This species is present in most of Europe, in the eastern Palearctic realm, and in North Africa. It has also been introduced to the eastern United States and Canada.

== Habitat ==
Cantharis livida lives in bushes, edges of forests and meadows.

== Subspecies ==
- Cantharis livida var. adusta Reitter
- Cantharis livida var. inscapularis Pic, 1909
- Cantharis livida var. luteiceps Schilsky
- Cantharis livida var. melaspis Chevrolat
- Cantharis livida var. menetriesi Faldermann, 1838
- Cantharis livida var. nigripes Schilsky, 1889
- Cantharis livida var. rufipes Herbst, 1784
- Cantharis livida var. scapularis Redtenbacher 1858
- Cantharis livida var. sicula Bourgeois, 1893
- Cantharis livida var. varendorffi Reitter, 1904
