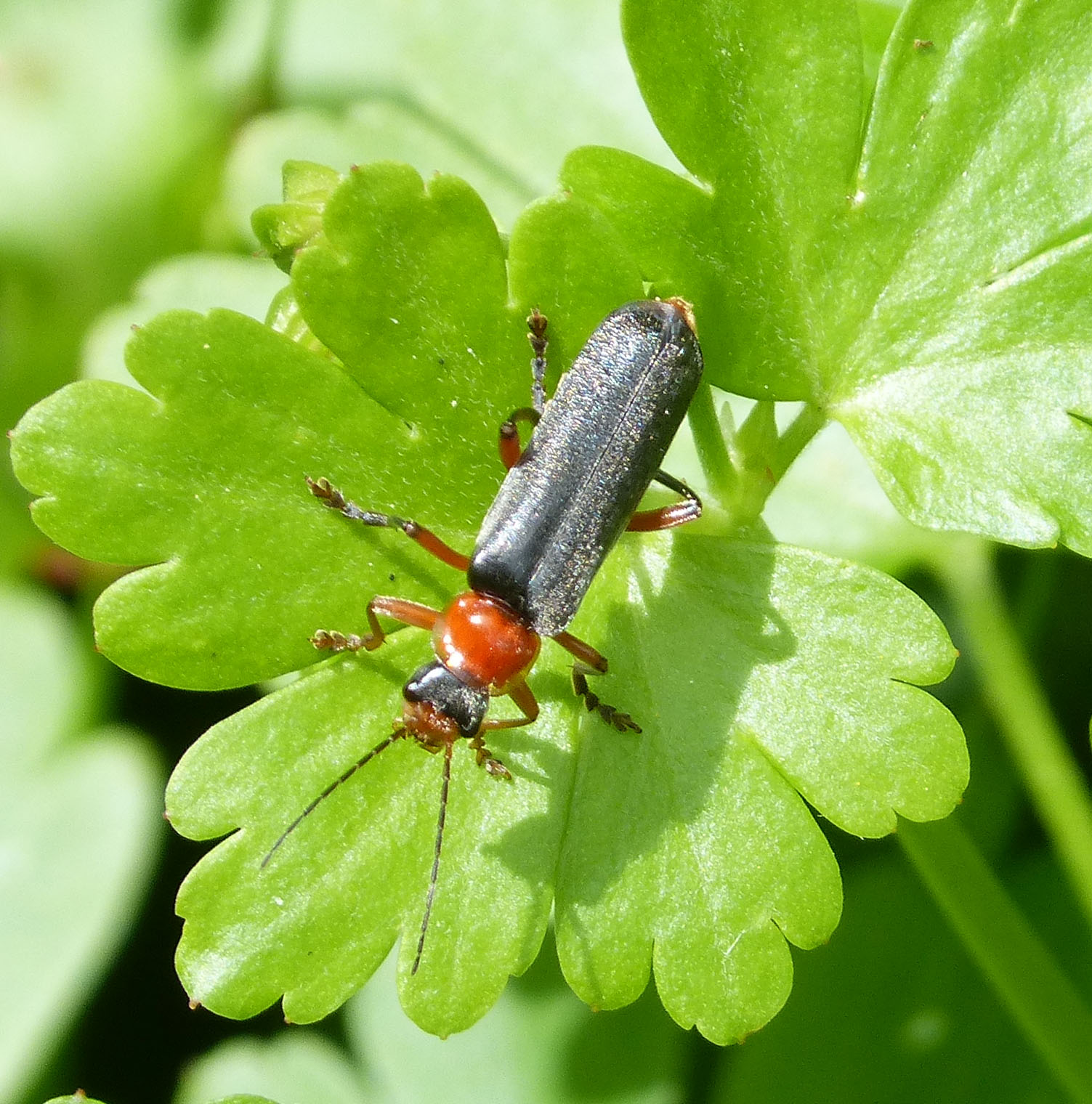
- Cantharis pellucida England

Scientific classification
- Kingdom: Animalia
- Phylum: Arthropoda
- Clade: Pancrustacea
- Class: Insecta
- Order: Coleoptera
- Suborder: Polyphaga
- Infraorder: Elateriformia
- Family: Cantharidae
- Genus: Cantharis
- Species: C. pellucida

Binomial name
- Cantharis pellucida Fabricius, 1792

= Cantharis pellucida =

Species of beetle

Cantharis pellucida is a species of soldier beetle native to Europe.
