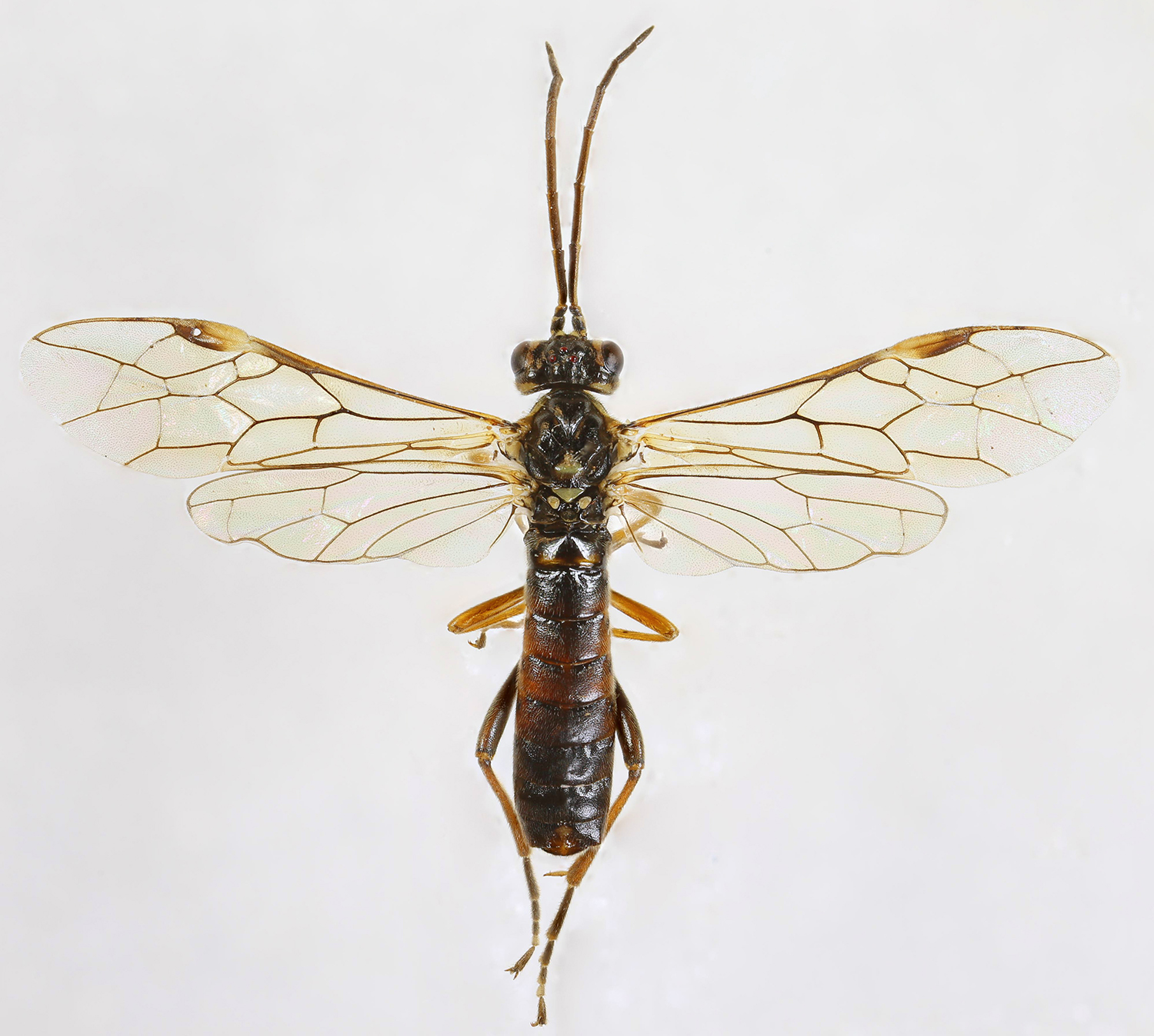
- Tenthredopsis nassata male, Nant Gwrtheyrn, North Wales

Scientific classification
- Kingdom: Animalia
- Phylum: Arthropoda
- Class: Insecta
- Order: Hymenoptera
- Suborder: Symphyta
- Family: Tenthredinidae
- Genus: Tenthredopsis
- Species: T. nassata

Binomial name
- Tenthredopsis nassata (Linnaeus, 1767)

= Tenthredopsis nassata =

Species of sawfly

Tenthredopsis nassata is a Palearctic species of sawfly.
