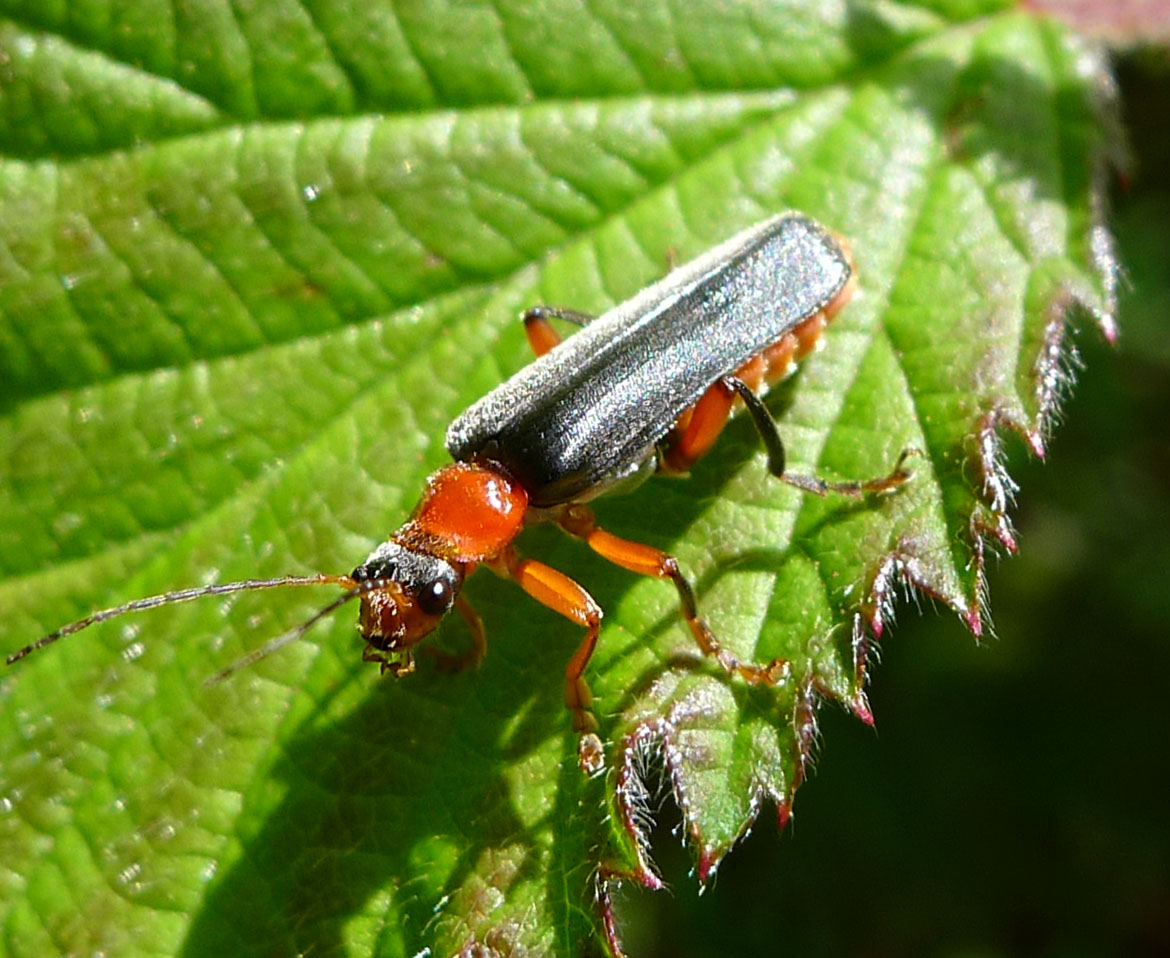
- Cantharis lateralis England

Scientific classification
- Kingdom: Animalia
- Phylum: Arthropoda
- Class: Insecta
- Order: Coleoptera
- Suborder: Polyphaga
- Infraorder: Elateriformia
- Family: Cantharidae
- Genus: Cantharis
- Species: C. lateralis

Binomial name
- Cantharis lateralis (Linnaeus, 1758)

= Cantharis lateralis =

Species of beetle

Cantharis lateralis is a species of soldier beetle native to Europe.
