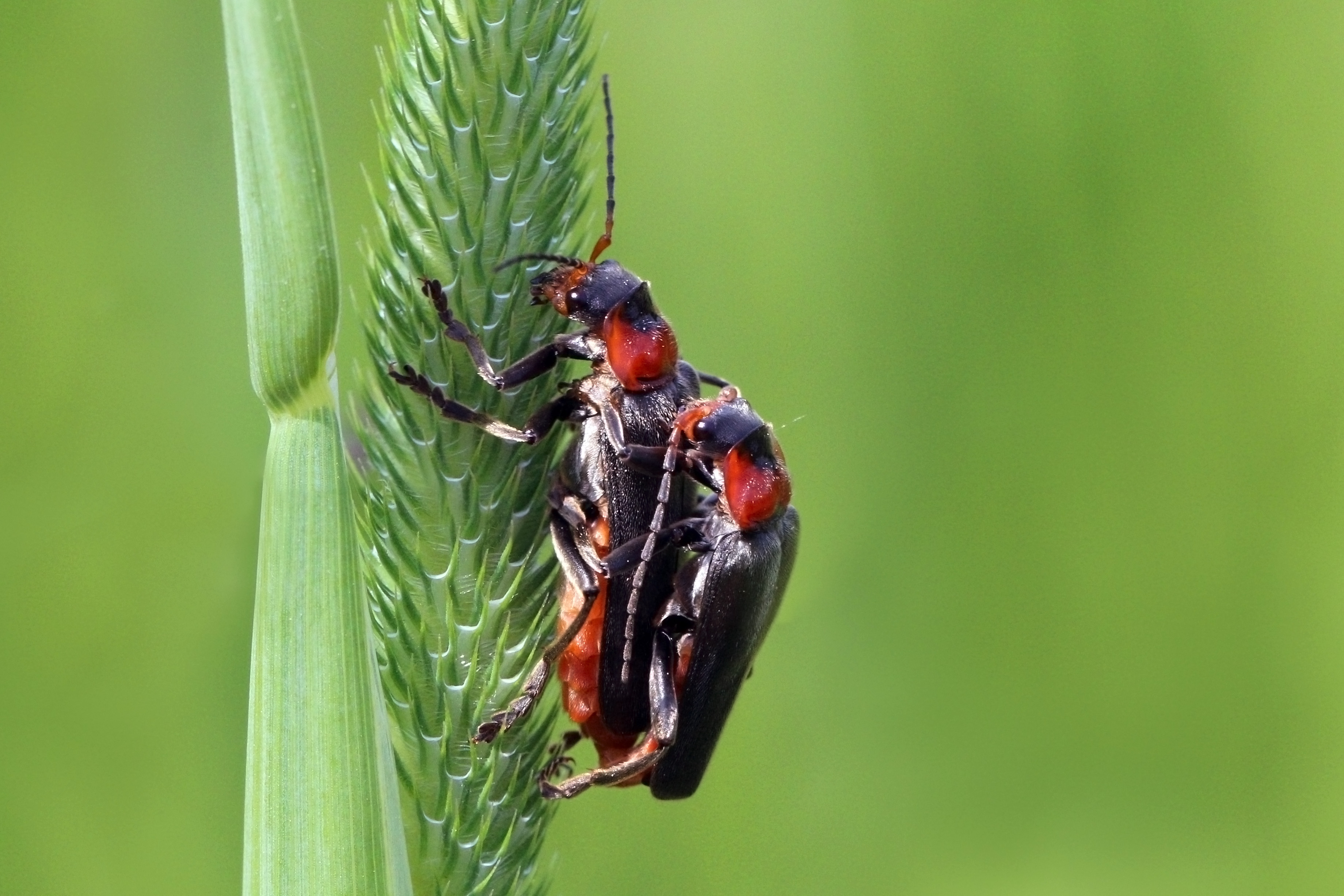
- Cantharis fusca mating Kampinos Forest, Poland

Scientific classification
- Kingdom: Animalia
- Phylum: Arthropoda
- Clade: Pancrustacea
- Class: Insecta
- Order: Coleoptera
- Suborder: Polyphaga
- Infraorder: Elateriformia
- Family: Cantharidae
- Subfamily: Cantharinae
- Tribe: Cantharini
- Genus: Cantharis; Linnaeus, 1758

= Cantharis =

Genus of beetles

Cantharis is a large genus of soldier beetles in the family Cantharidae. They are a carnivorous genus with narrow and soft elytra. They live in meadows.

The poisonous Spanish fly is superficially similar and is associated with the scientific name Cantharis vesicatoria. It is also sometimes called "cantharis" in the vernacular, but it is actually unrelated to Cantharis and is not a member of the Cantharidae at all. It was classified there erroneously until Johan Christian Fabricius corrected its name in his Systema entomologiae in 1775. He reclassified the Spanish fly in the new genus Lytta as Lytta vesicatoria. It belongs to the family Meloidae.

== Habitat ==
They live in meadows and arable land likely due to favorable microclimatic conditions for their larva which prefer high relative humidity. They occurred in high abundance.

== Behavior ==
Both the adults and larva of this genus are, at least, partially carnivorous playing a role in arthropod communities. They will prey on a variety of invertebrates, particularly soft-bodied species, such as earthworms, dipteran larvae and lepidopteran larvae. However their predation on invertebrates might be low under natural conditions with adults probably feeding mainly on nectar, pollen and honeydew.

They can also serve as natural pest control for agriculture due to their high abundance and general carnivory.

== Species ==
=== Subgenus Cantharis ===
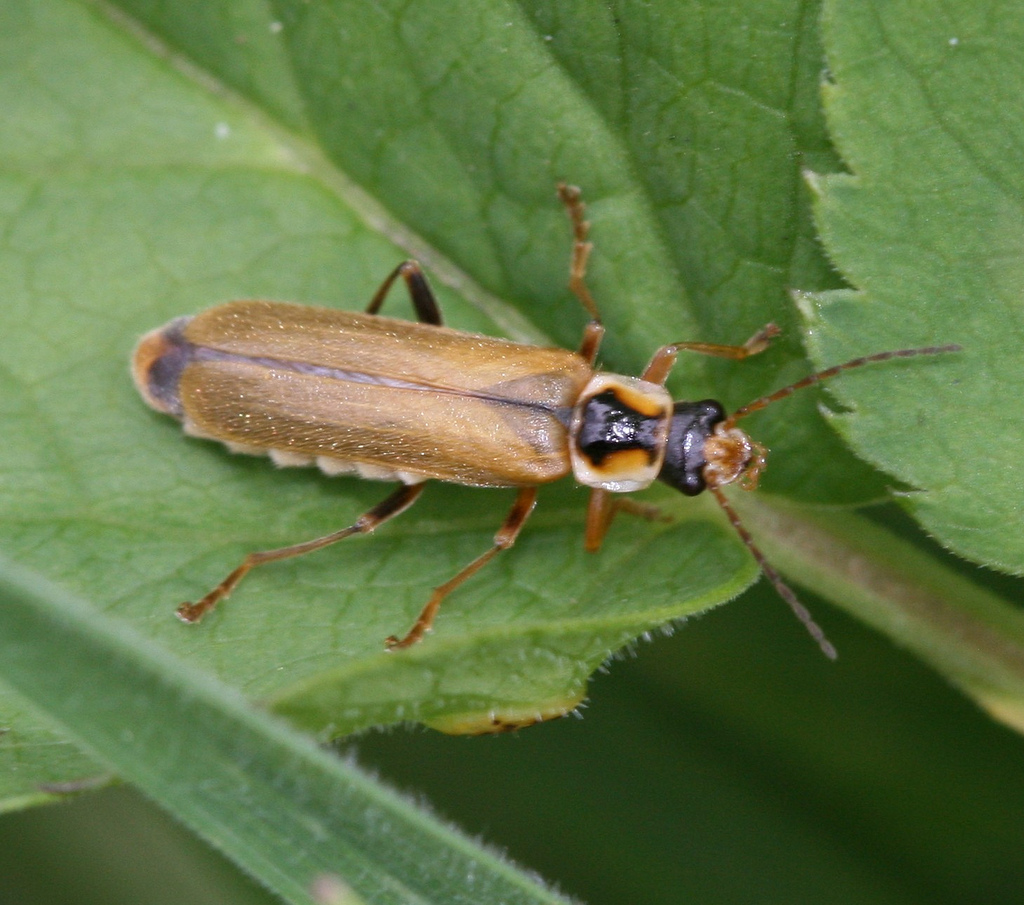
Cantharis decipiens

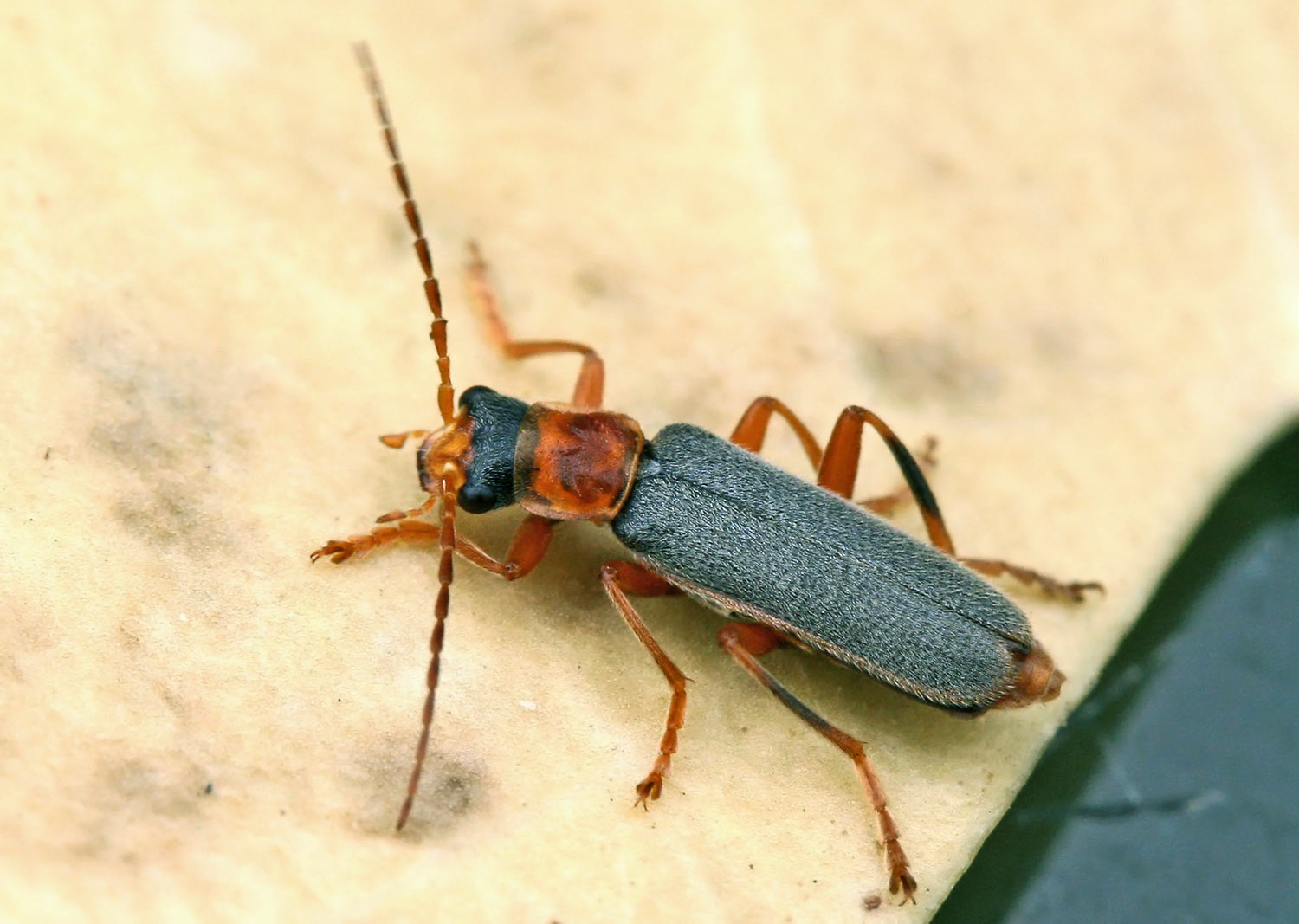
Cantharis lateralis

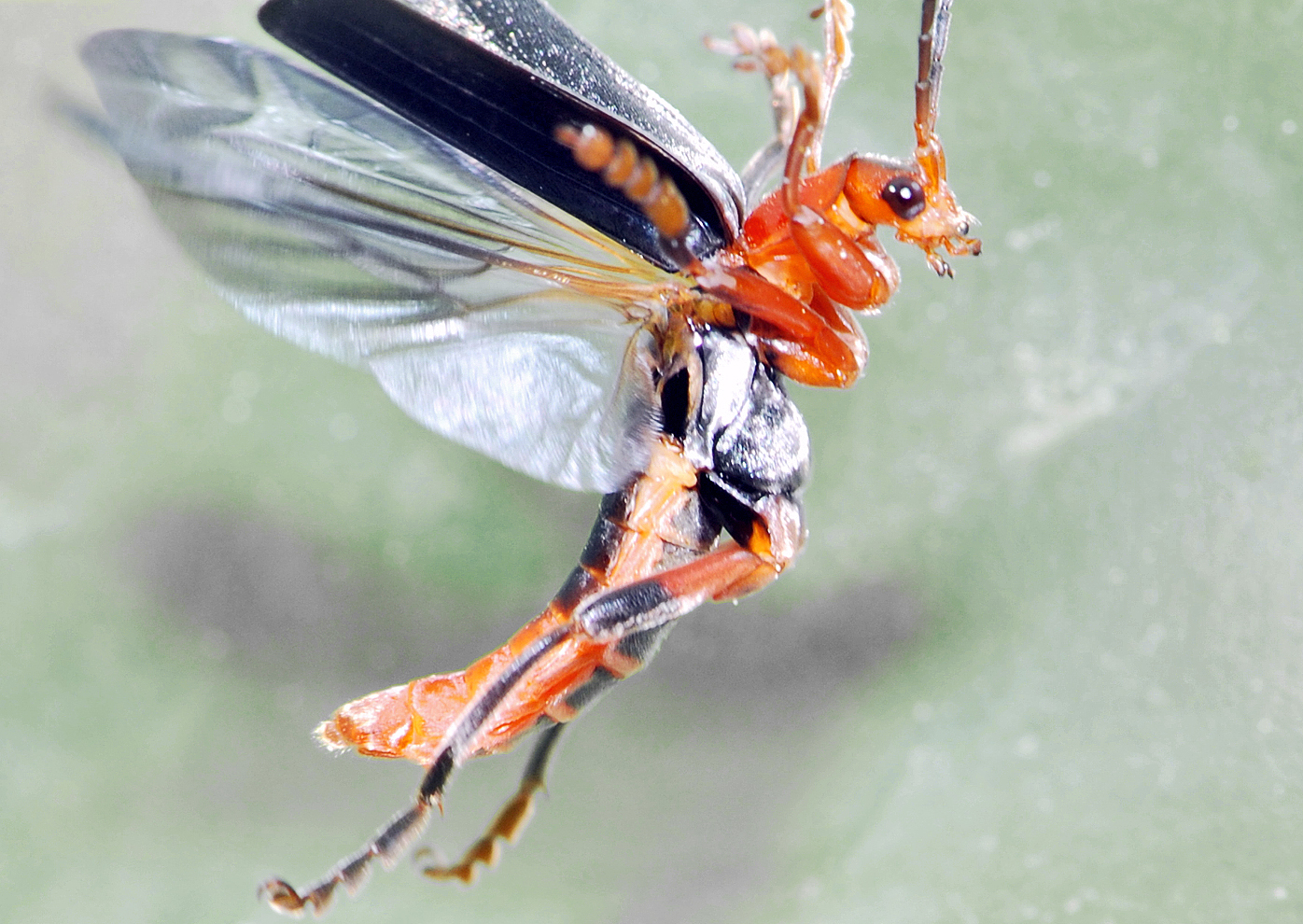
Cantharis livida

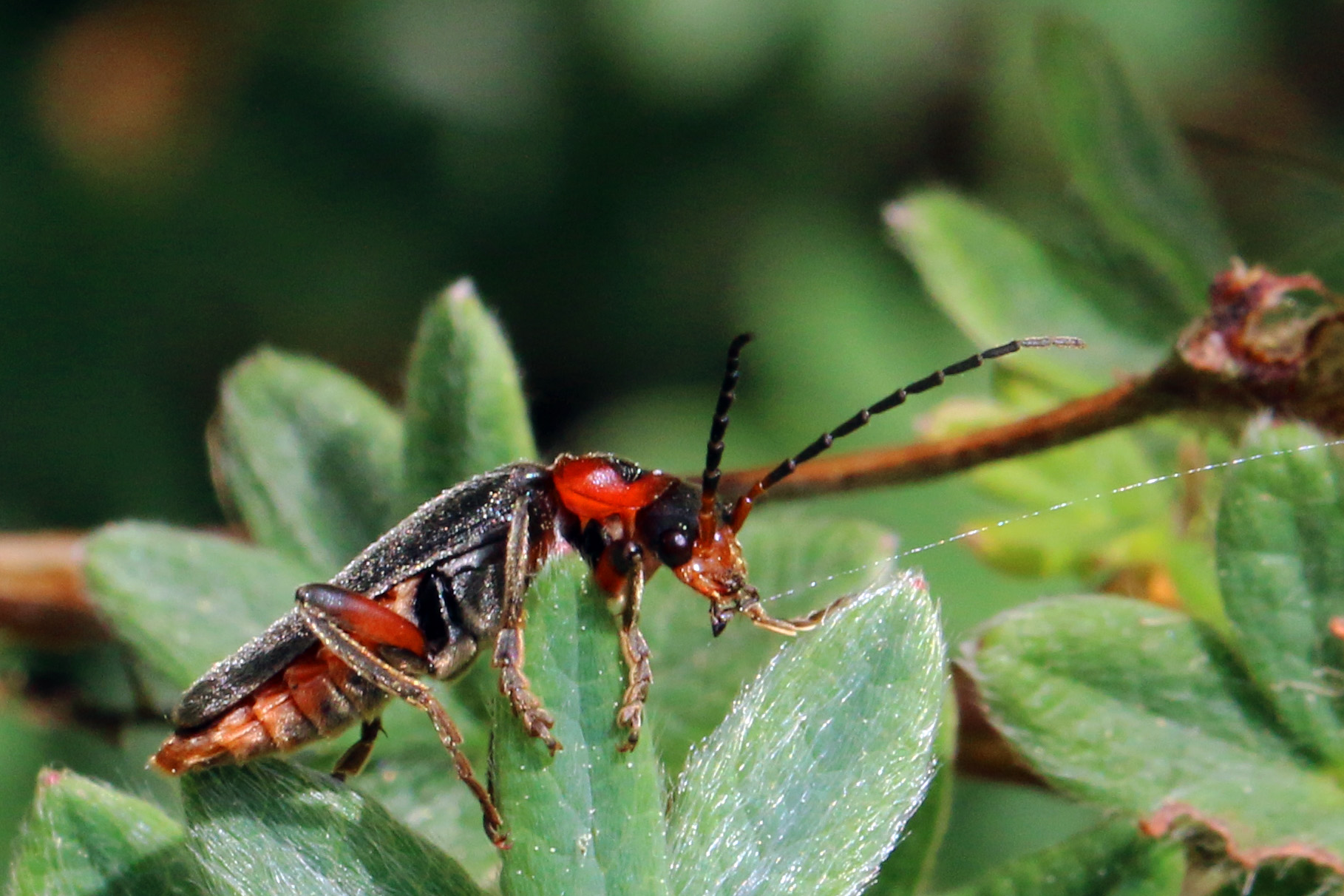
Cantharis pellucida

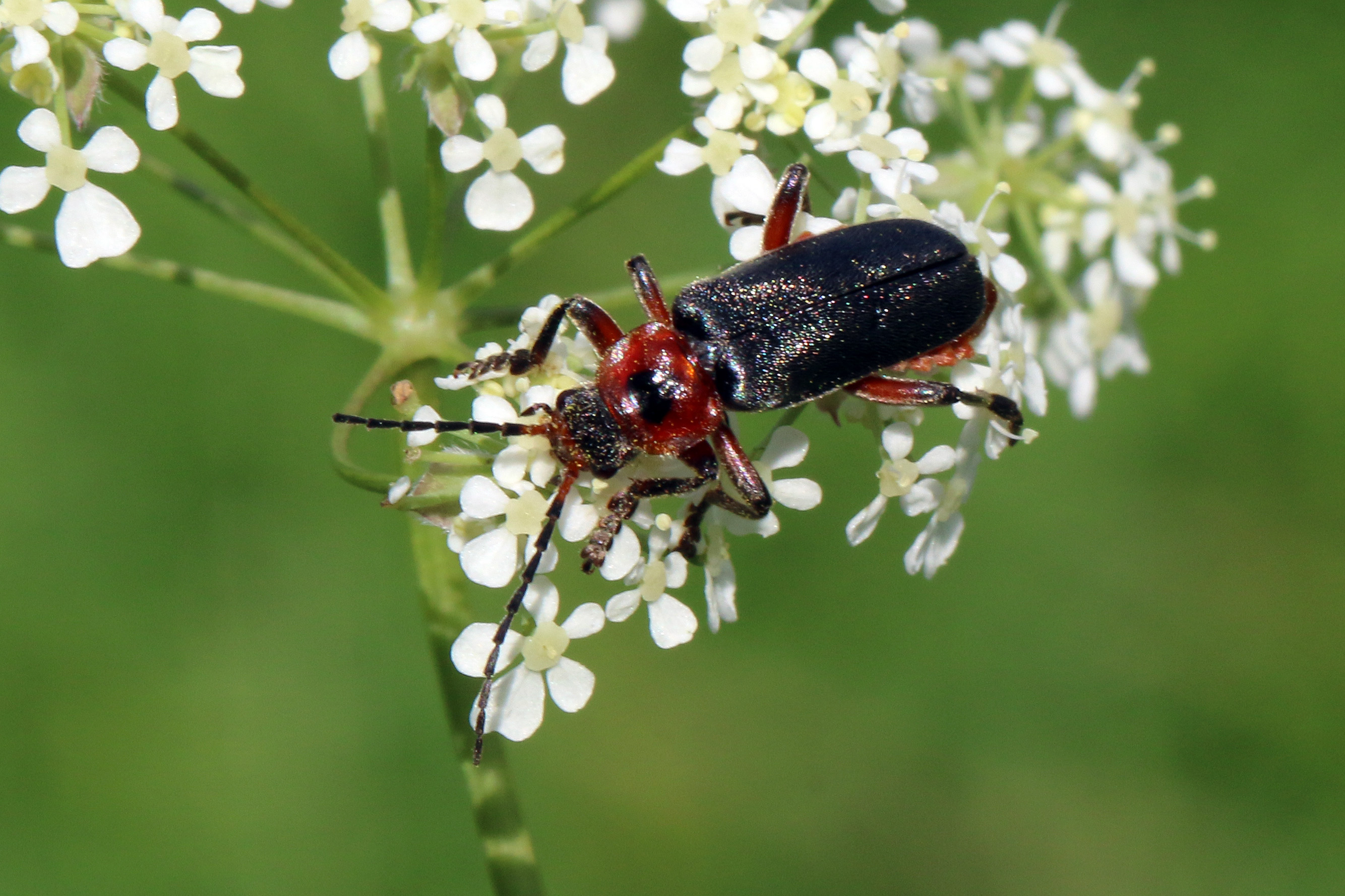
Cantharis rustica

- Cantharis allosensis Pic, 1924
- Cantharis annularis Menetriez, 1836
- Cantharis antennalis (Marseul, 1864)
- Cantharis ariasi (Mulsant, 1862)
- Cantharis assimilis Paykull, 1798
- Cantharis atrata (Marseul, 1864)
- Cantharis basithorax Pic, 1902
- Cantharis beckeri (Pic, 1902)
- Cantharis brevicornis (Kiesenwetter, 1852)
- Cantharis brullei (Marseul, 1864)
- Cantharis cedricola Wittmer, 1971
- Cantharis cornix (Abeille de Perrin, 1869)
- Cantharis coronata Gyllenhal, 1808
- Cantharis corvina Moscardini, 1962
- Cantharis cretica Wittmer, 1971
- Cantharis cryptica Ashe, 1947
- Cantharis cypria (Marseul, 1864)
- Cantharis darwiniana Sharp, 1867
- Cantharis decipiens Baudi, 1871
- Cantharis decolorans Brullé, 1832
- Cantharis delagrangei Delkeskamp, 1939
- Cantharis dissipata Gemminger, 1870
- Cantharis edentula Baudi, 1871
- Cantharis ephippigera (Brullé, 1832)
- Cantharis europea Pic, 1921
- Cantharis falzonii Fiori 1914
- Cantharis figurata Mannerheim, 1843
- Cantharis flavilabris Fallén, 1807
- Cantharis franciana Kiesenwetter, 1866
- Cantharis fusca Linnaeus, 1758 - type species
- Cantharis fuscipennis (Mulsant, 1862)
- Cantharis groehni
- Cantharis hellenica Heyden, 1883
- Cantharis ictaria Fiori, 1914
- Cantharis inculta Gene, 1839
- Cantharis instabilis Kiesenwetter, 1866
- Cantharis italica Fiori, 1914
- Cantharis kervillei Pic, 1932
- Cantharis liburnica Depoli, 1912
- Cantharis livida Linnaeus, 1758
- Cantharis merula Moscardini, 1862
- Cantharis monacha Moscardini, 1862
- Cantharis montana Stierlin, 1889
- Cantharis morio Fabricius, 1792
- Cantharis navka Kazantsev & Perkovsky, 2026
- Cantharis nevadensis Pic, 1908
- Cantharis nigra (De Geer, 1774)
- Cantharis nigricans Müller, 1766
- Cantharis nigricornis (Laporte de Castelnau, 1840)
- Cantharis obscura Linnaeus, 1758
- Cantharis ochreata (Reiche, 1878)
- Cantharis paganettii (Flach, 1907)
- Cantharis palliata Gyllenhal, 1808
- Cantharis pallida Goeze, 1777
- Cantharis paludosa Fallén, 1807
- Cantharis paradoxa Hicker, 1960
- Cantharis paulinoi Kiesenwetter, 1870
- Cantharis pellucida Fabricius, 1792
- Cantharis peninsularis Fiori, 1914
- Cantharis praecox Gene, 1836
- Cantharis prusiensis (Marseul, 1864)
- Cantharis pulicaria Fabricius, 1781
- Cantharis pyrenaea Pic, 1906
- Cantharis quadripunctata (Müller, 1776)
- Cantharis reichei Mulsant, 1862
- Cantharis rufa Linnaeus, 1758
- Cantharis rustica Fallén, 1807
- Cantharis schrammi Pic, 1907
- Cantharis seidlitzi Kiesenwetter, 1865
- Cantharis soeulensis Pic, 1922
- Cantharis sicula Pic, 1906
- Cantharis smyrnensis (Marseul, 1864)
- Cantharis terminata Faldermann, 1835
- Cantharis torretasoi Wittmer, 1935
- Cantharis tristis Fabricius, 1797
- Cantharis versicolor (Baudi, 1871)
- Cantharis xanthoporpa Kiesenwetter, 1860

=== Subgenus Cyrtomoptila ===
- Cantharis carsteni
- Cantharis gemina Dahlgren, 1974
- Cantharis lateralis Linnaeus, 1758
- Cantharis pagana Rosenhauer, 1847

== See also ==
- List of Cantharis species
