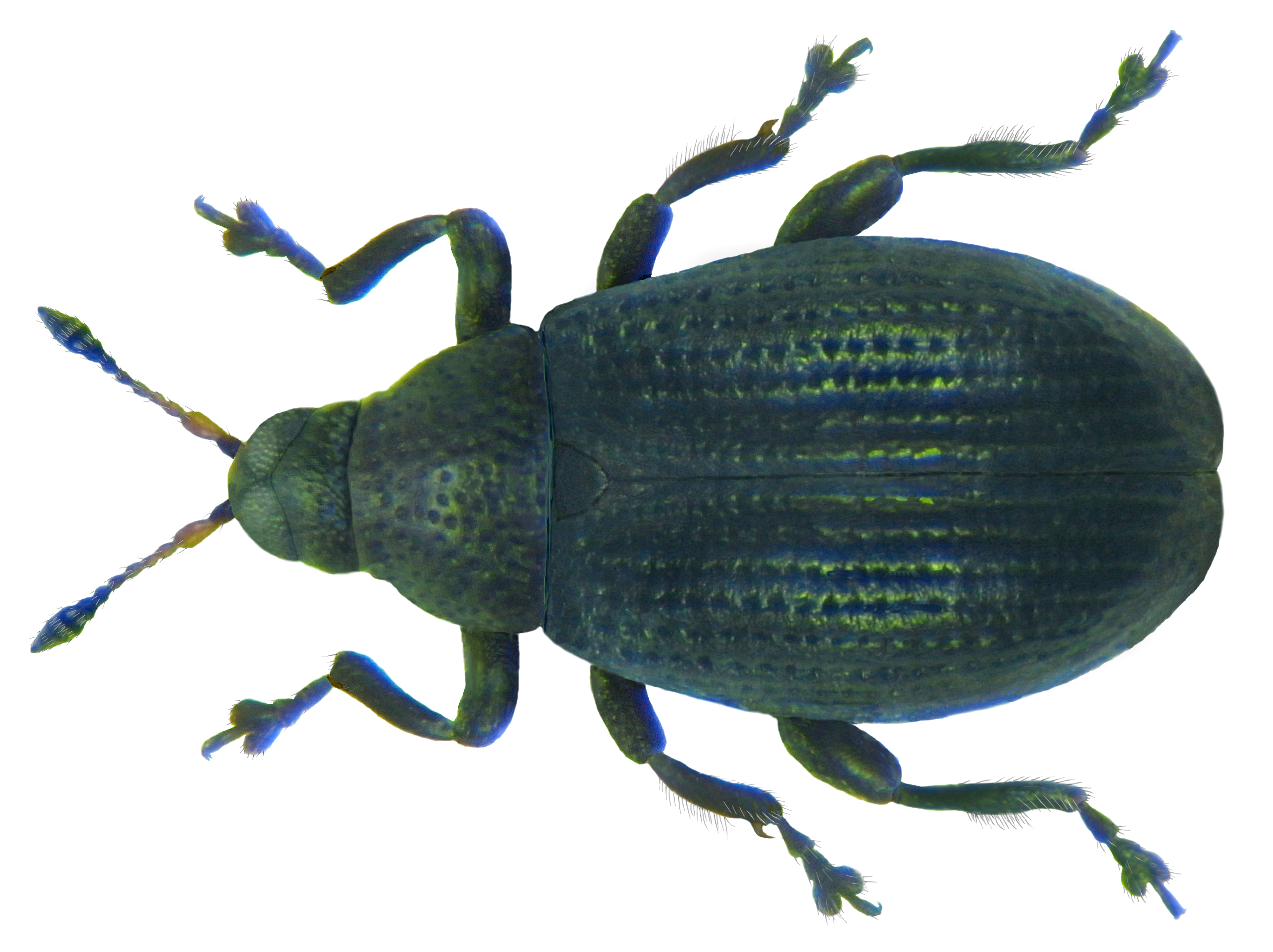
- Rhamphus pulicarius 1,8 mm (1,4-2 mm)

Scientific classification
- Kingdom: Animalia
- Phylum: Arthropoda
- Class: Insecta
- Order: Coleoptera
- Suborder: Polyphaga
- Infraorder: Cucujiformia
- Family: Curculionidae
- Subfamily: Curculioninae
- Tribe: Rhamphini
- Genus: Rhamphus
- Species: R. pulicarius

Binomial name
- Rhamphus pulicarius ( Herbst, 1795)

= Rhamphus pulicarius =

Species of beetle

Rhamphus pulicarius is a species of weevil native to Europe.
