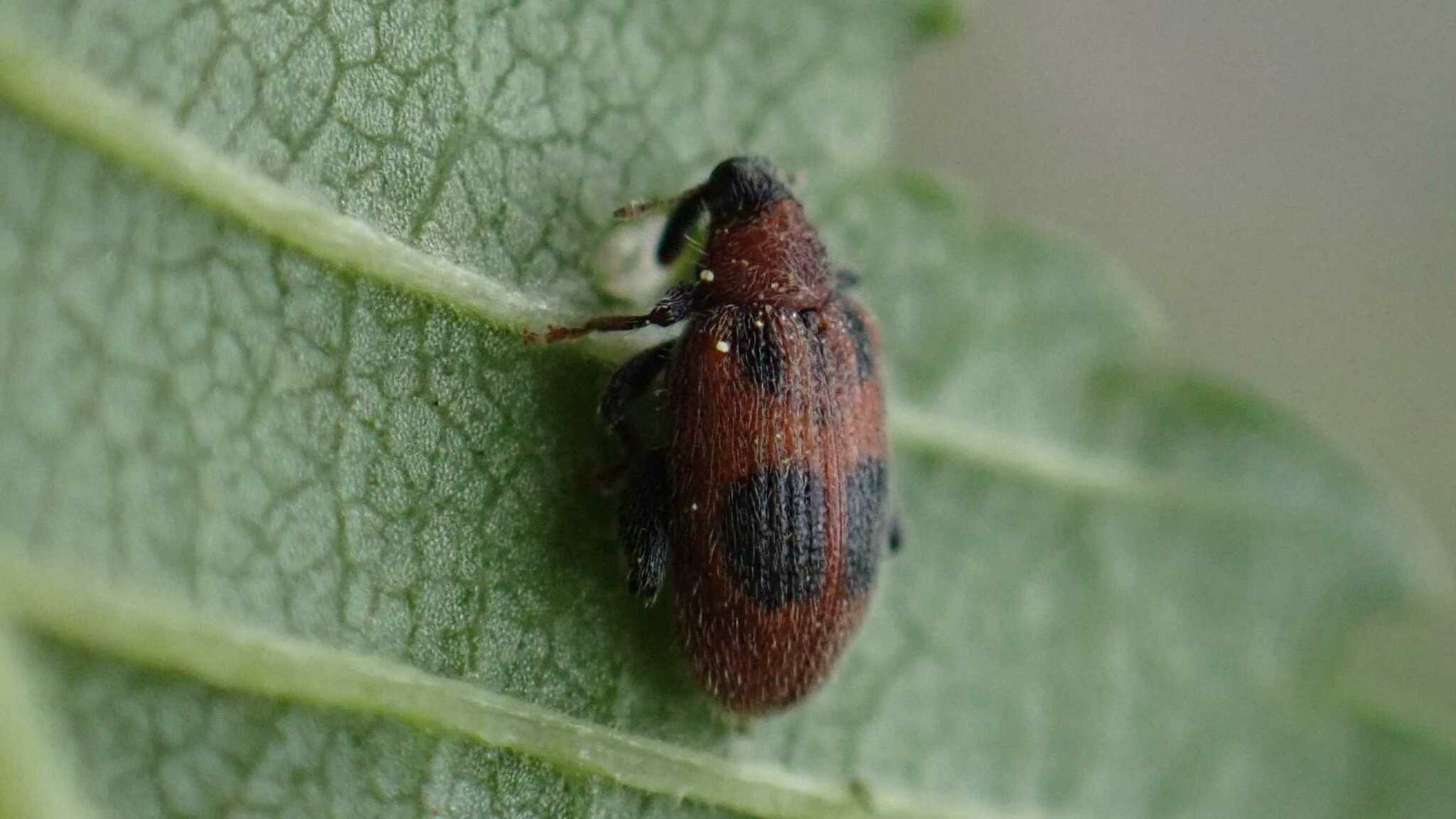
- Orchestes alni, Germany

Scientific classification
- Kingdom: Animalia
- Phylum: Arthropoda
- Clade: Pancrustacea
- Class: Insecta
- Order: Coleoptera
- Suborder: Polyphaga
- Infraorder: Cucujiformia
- Superfamily: Curculionoidea
- Family: Curculionidae
- Tribe: Rhamphini
- Subtribe: Rhamphina
- Genus: Orchestes
- Species: O. alni

Binomial name
- Orchestes alni ( Linnaeus, 1758)

= Orchestes alni =

Species of beetle

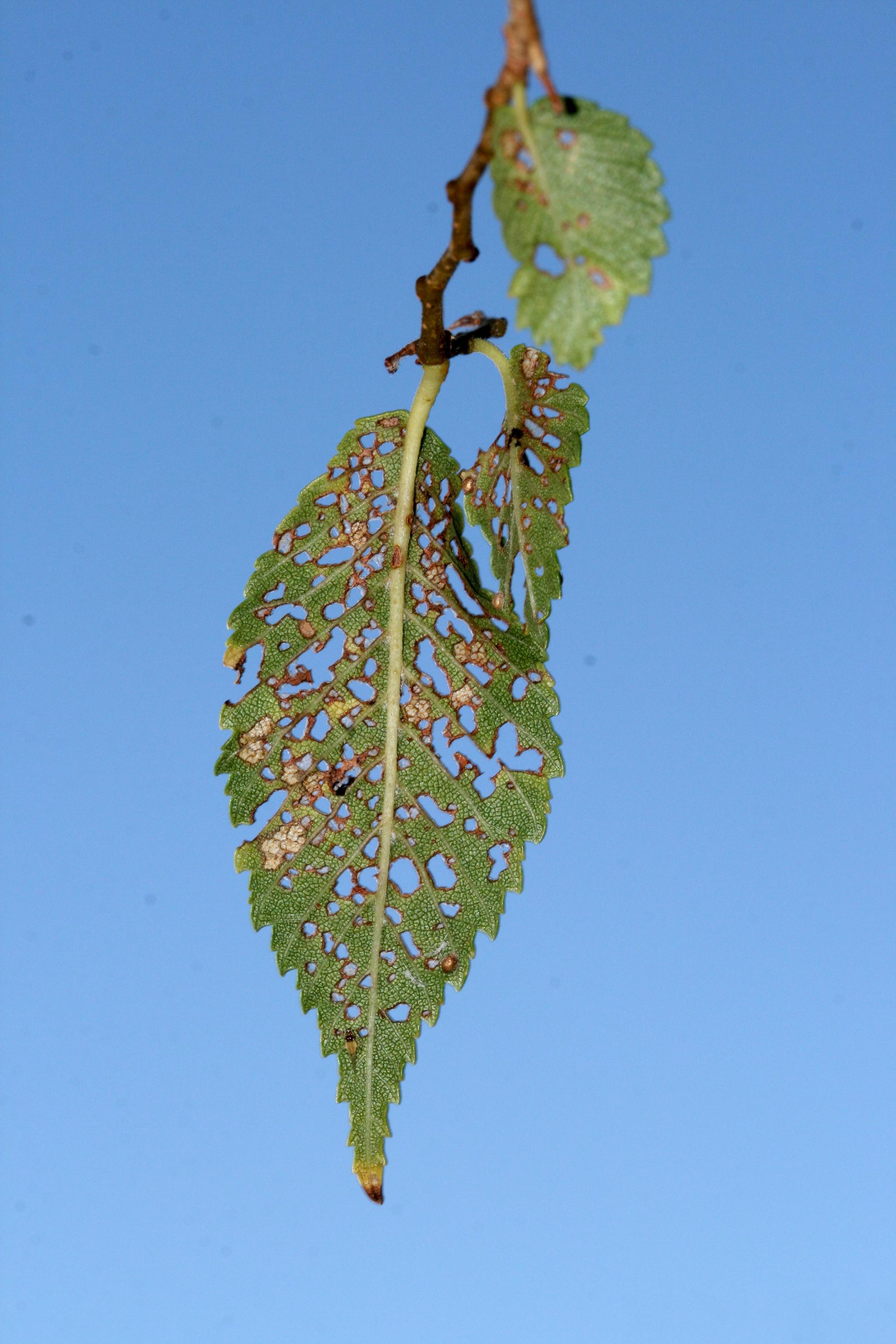
Orchestes alni Shothole symptoms produced by adult feeding on Siberian elm

Orchestes alni is a species of weevil native to Europe. Reports of this species in North America were misidentifications of the closely related species, Orchestes steppensis.
