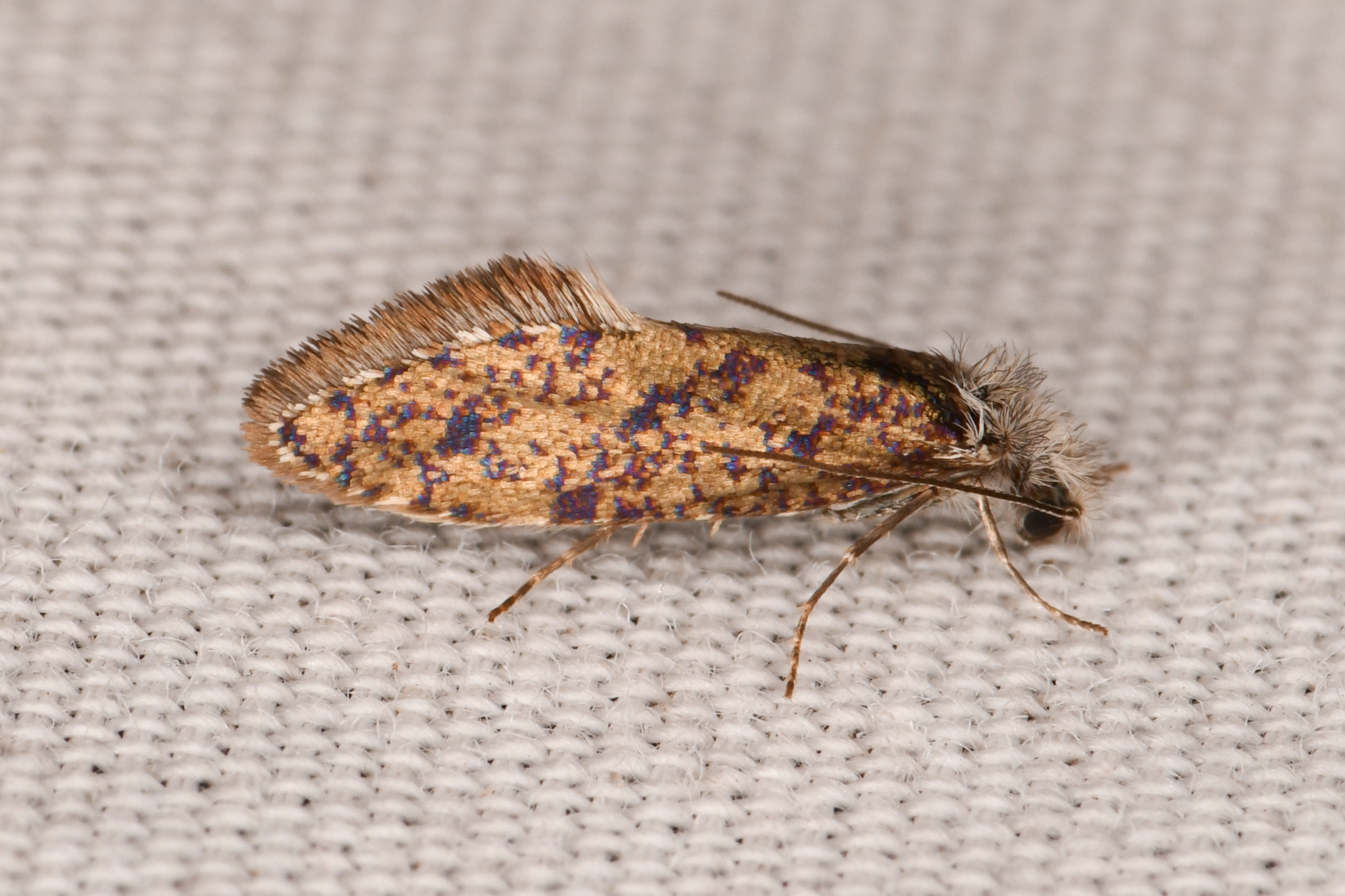

Scientific classification
- Domain: Eukaryota
- Kingdom: Animalia
- Phylum: Arthropoda
- Class: Insecta
- Order: Lepidoptera
- Family: Eriocraniidae
- Genus: Dyseriocrania
- Species: D. auricyanea

Binomial name
- Dyseriocrania auricyanea (Walsingham, 1882)

Synonyms
- List: Micropteryx auricyanea Walsingham, 1882; Eriocrania auricyanea; Eriocephala auricyanea; Mnemonica auricyanea; Eriocrania cyanosparsella Williams, 1908; Mnemonica cyanosparsella; Dyseriocrania cyanosparsella

= Dyseriocrania auricyanea =

Moth species in family Eriocraniidae

Dyseriocrania auricyanea is a moth of the family Eriocraniidae. It was first described by Baron Walsingham in 1882 and is found in California.

The wingspan is 10.5–13 mm for males and 9.3–10.5 mm for females. The forewings are pale golden brown, and rather distinctly marked with several small patches of darker, purplish scales. The hindwings are slightly darker in color and more grayish brown with a slight purplish luster. Adults are on wing from early March to mid-April in one generation per year.

The larvae possibly feed on the coast live oak (Quercus agrifolia), blue oak (Quercus douglasii), coastal sage scrub oak (Quercus dumosa), valley oak (Quercus lobata) and interior live oak (Quercus wislizenii). They mine the leaves of their host plant. The mine starts as a linear or slightly curved passage to the leaf margin. It is then quickly enlarged to an inflated, full-length blotch. Full-grown larvae leave the mine through a slit in the upper leaf epidermis and drop to the ground. They then burrow into the litter beneath the host plant and form a whitish silken cocoon covered with darker soil particles. The larvae have a brownish body and a dark brown head.
