= Tachygonus =

Scientific classification
- Kingdom: Animalia
- Phylum: Arthropoda
- Class: Insecta
- Order: Coleoptera
- Suborder: Polyphaga
- Infraorder: Cucujiformia
- Family: Curculionidae
- Tribe: Rhamphini
- Genus: Tachygonus; Guérin-Ménéville, 1833

Genus of beetles

Tachygonus is a genus of flea weevils in the beetle family Curculionidae. There are more than 80 described species in Tachygonus.

== Species ==
These 88 species belong to the genus Tachygonus:

- Tachygonus alineae Monte, 1942
- Tachygonus almeidai Monte, 1946
- Tachygonus araujoi Monte, 1942
- Tachygonus argentinus Viana, 1949
- Tachygonus atrosignatus Monte, 1949
- Tachygonus autuoni Monte, 1942
- Tachygonus bauhiniae Hustache, 1941
- Tachygonus bicolor Monte, 1949
- Tachygonus bicoloripes Viana, 1949
- Tachygonus bidentatus Champion & G.C., 1907
- Tachygonus bifasciculatus Champion & G.C., 1907
- Tachygonus bitancourti Monte, 1942
- Tachygonus bondari Marshall, 1938
- Tachygonus buchanani Monte, 1949
- Tachygonus caseyi Champion & G.C., 1907
- Tachygonus centralis LeConte, 1868
- Tachygonus comptus Monte, 1949
- Tachygonus costalimai Monte, 1942
- Tachygonus curvicrus Champion & G.C., 1906
- Tachygonus decarloi Viana, 1954
- Tachygonus dufaui Hustache, 1932
- Tachygonus erythroxyli Hespenheide, 2012
- Tachygonus farruginous Monte
- Tachygonus fasciculosus Boheman, 1839
- Tachygonus femoralis Monte, 1949
- Tachygonus ferrugineus Monte, 1949
- Tachygonus fiebrigi Voss, 1943
- Tachygonus fiohri Champion & G.C., 1906
- Tachygonus flavisetis Champion & G.C., 1906
- Tachygonus fulvipes LeConte, 1876
- Tachygonus garciai Viana, 1954
- Tachygonus godweyi Marshall & G.A.K., 1926
- Tachygonus gowdeyi Marshall, 1926
- Tachygonus gracilipes Casey & T.L., 1897
- Tachygonus guerini Monte, 1942
- Tachygonus horridus Laporte, 1840
- Tachygonus hydropicus Gyllenhal, 1839
- Tachygonus impar Voss, 1954
- Tachygonus inconstans Hustache, 1939
- Tachygonus ingae Monte, 1944
- Tachygonus kuscheli Viana, 1954
- Tachygonus laminicrus Marshall, 1938
- Tachygonus laminipes Marshall & G.A.K., 1938
- Tachygonus laticrus Champion & G.C., 1906
- Tachygonus lecontei Gyllenhal, 1833
- Tachygonus leprieuri Chevrolat & L.A.A., 1829-44
- Tachygonus leprieurii Chevrolat in Guérin-Méneville, 1844
- Tachygonus martinezi Viana, 1954
- Tachygonus minans Kogan, 1963
- Tachygonus minutus Blatchley, 1920
- Tachygonus mirus Monte, 1949
- Tachygonus monrosi Viana, 1954
- Tachygonus montanus Monte, 1949
- Tachygonus neivai Monte, 1942
- Tachygonus nigar Monte
- Tachygonus niger Monte, 1949
- Tachygonus nigrescens Blatchley, 1922
- Tachygonus nigrocristatus Champion & G.C., 1906
- Tachygonus nitidus Monte, 1949
- Tachygonus oglobini Viana, 1949
- Tachygonus ogloblini Viana, 1949
- Tachygonus oliverioi Monte, 1942
- Tachygonus orfilai Viana, 1954
- Tachygonus paraguayensis Viana, 1954
- Tachygonus pectinisquamis Champion & G.C., 1906
- Tachygonus phalangium Klima & A., 1936
- Tachygonus pubescens Monte, 1944
- Tachygonus pullus Hustache, 1941
- Tachygonus quadrisignatus Champion, 1910
- Tachygonus quinquedentatus Champion & G.C., 1906
- Tachygonus regularis Hustache, 1939
- Tachygonus rhombus Casey, 1897
- Tachygonus riggii Viana, 1949
- Tachygonus rufipennis Voss, 1940
- Tachygonus rufovarius Kirsch & T., 1875
- Tachygonus rufus Hustache, 1939
- Tachygonus rugosipennis Hustache, 1941
- Tachygonus rugosus Monte, 1949
- Tachygonus schonherri Faust & J., 1896
- Tachygonus schönherri Faust, J., 1896
- Tachygonus sculpturatus Monte, 1944
- Tachygonus scutellaris Kirsch & T., 1875
- Tachygonus semirufus Champion & G.C., 1906
- Tachygonus sinuaticrus Champion & G.C., 1906
- Tachygonus spinipes Casey & T.L., 1897
- Tachygonus tardipes LeConte, 1876
- Tachygonus validus Monte, 1949
- Tachygonus willineri Viana
