= Reidius fasciculatus =

Scientific classification
- Kingdom: Animalia
- Phylum: Arthropoda
- Clade: Pancrustacea
- Class: Insecta
- Order: Coleoptera
- Suborder: Polyphaga
- Infraorder: Cucujiformia
- Superfamily: Curculionoidea
- Family: Curculionidae
- Genus: Reidius
- Species: R. fasciculatus

Binomial name
- Reidius fasciculatus (Lea, 1930)

Synonyms
- Eutinophaea fasciculata Lea, 1930

Species of beetle

Reidius fasciculatus is a species of beetle of the family Curculionidae. It is found in Australia (Queensland).

== Description ==
Adults reach a length of about 3.2 mm (0.13 in). They are dark reddish-brown, with the legs and antennae paler. They are densely clothed with light brown scales, mixed with paler and darker ones, and becoming paler on the underside.
