= Eutinophaea =

Scientific classification
- Kingdom: Animalia
- Phylum: Arthropoda
- Clade: Pancrustacea
- Class: Insecta
- Order: Coleoptera
- Suborder: Polyphaga
- Infraorder: Cucujiformia
- Superfamily: Curculionoidea
- Family: Curculionidae
- Subfamily: Entiminae
- Tribe: Ottistirini
- Genus: Eutinophaea; Pascoe, 1870

Genus of beetles

Eutinophaea is a genus of beetles belonging to the family Curculionidae.

== Species ==
- Eutinophaea flavovirens Heller, 1925
- Eutinophaea laeta (Faust, 1899)
- Eutinophaea nana Pascoe, 1870
- Eutinophaea papuensis Lea, 1930
- Eutinophaea viridis (Faust, 1899)
- Eutinophaea wallacei Heller, 1925
