= Tachygonus rhombus =

Scientific classification
- Kingdom: Animalia
- Phylum: Arthropoda
- Class: Insecta
- Order: Coleoptera
- Suborder: Polyphaga
- Infraorder: Cucujiformia
- Family: Curculionidae
- Genus: Tachygonus
- Species: T. rhombus

Binomial name
- Tachygonus rhombus Casey, 1897

Species of beetle

Tachygonus rhombus is a species of flea weevil in the beetle family Curculionidae. It is found in North America.
