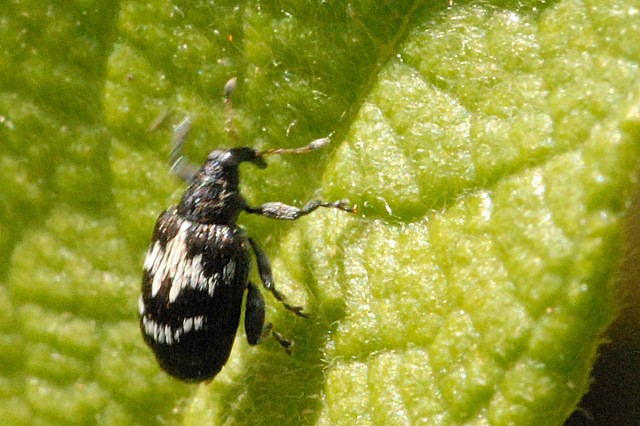
- Tachyerges salicis

Scientific classification
- Domain: Eukaryota
- Kingdom: Animalia
- Phylum: Arthropoda
- Class: Insecta
- Order: Coleoptera
- Suborder: Polyphaga
- Infraorder: Cucujiformia
- Family: Curculionidae
- Subfamily: Curculioninae
- Tribe: Rhamphini
- Genus: Tachyerges; Schénherr, 1825

= Tachyerges =

Genus of beetles

Tachyerges is a genus of beetles belonging to the family Curculionidae.

The species of this genus are found in Europe and Northern America.

Species:

- Tachyerges salicis
- Tachyerges stigma
