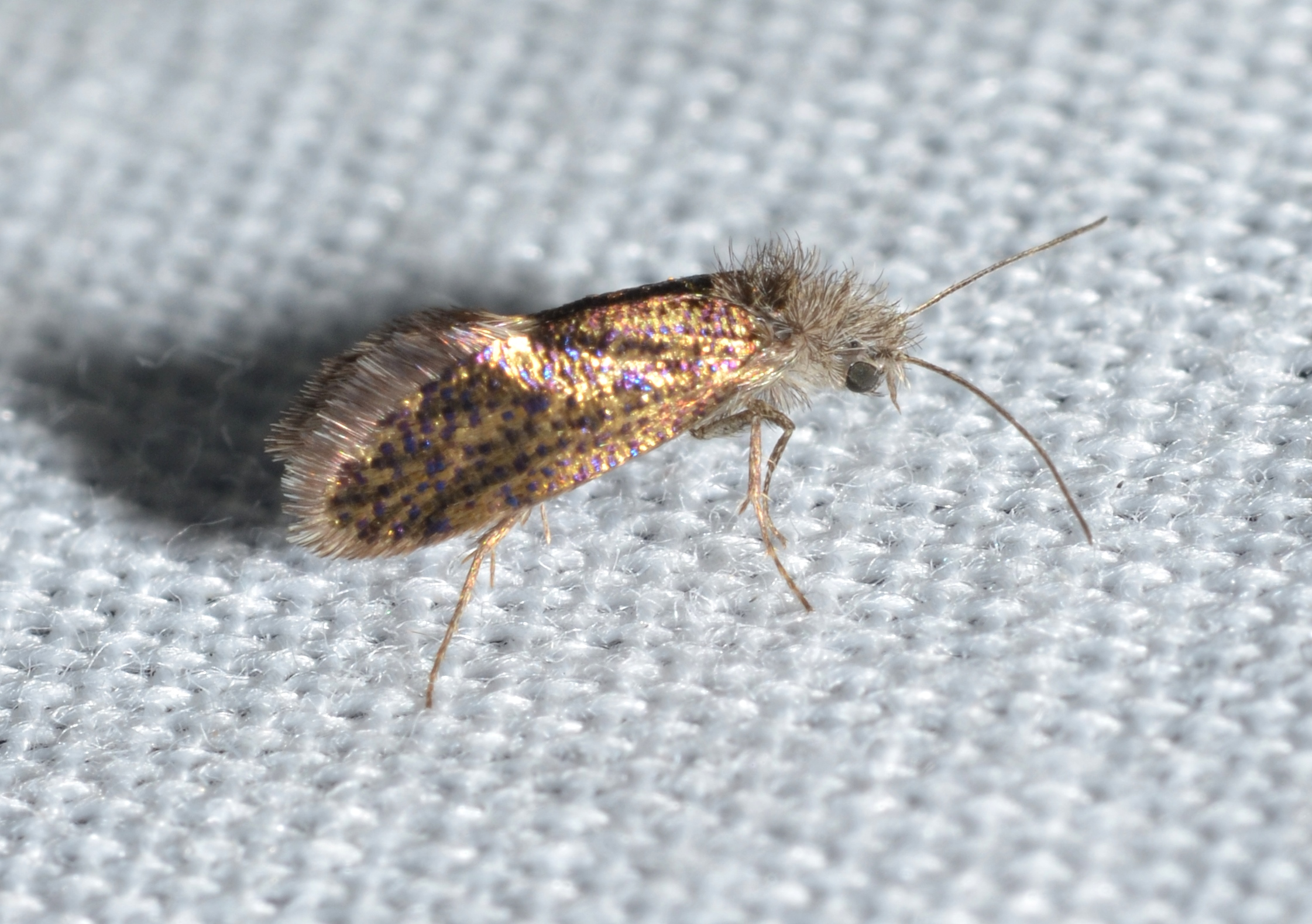

Scientific classification
- Kingdom: Animalia
- Phylum: Arthropoda
- Clade: Pancrustacea
- Class: Insecta
- Order: Lepidoptera
- Family: Eriocraniidae
- Genus: Dyseriocrania
- Species: D. griseocapitella

Binomial name
- Dyseriocrania griseocapitella (Walsingham, 1898)

Synonyms
- Eriocrania griseocapitella Walsingham, 1898; Eriocephala griseocapitella; Mnemonica griseocapitella

= Dyseriocrania griseocapitella =

Moth species in family Eriocraniidae

Dyseriocrania griseocapitella (Chinquapin leaf-miner) is a moth of the family Eriocraniidae. It is found from Nova Scotia to Florida, west to Illinois and Mississippi.

The wingspan is 10–13 mm for males and 9-12.5 mm for females. The forewings are golden bronze, heavily mottled with minute specks of darker scales. The hindwings are paler, grayish with a slight purplish luster, sparsely covered with moderately broad scales. The moth flies from late February to late May in one generation per year.

The larvae feed on Castanea and Quercus species. They mine the leaves of their host plant. The mine starts as a narrow, linear passage extending toward the leaf margin. This early stage of the mine is usually obliterated as the mine is enlarged. Immediately following the serpentine stage, the mine broadens to form a large, somewhat inflated blotch. Full-grown larvae drop to the ground and burrow into the soil. Here, they create a relatively tough oval cocoon of silk and small particles of soil. The larvae have a dark brown body and a pale brown to light yellow head.
