= Leacis =

Scientific classification
- Kingdom: Animalia
- Phylum: Arthropoda
- Clade: Pancrustacea
- Class: Insecta
- Order: Coleoptera
- Suborder: Polyphaga
- Infraorder: Cucujiformia
- Family: Curculionidae
- Subfamily: Entiminae
- Tribe: Ottistirini
- Genus: Leacis; Zimmerman, 1939
- Species: L. vitiensis

Binomial name
- Leacis vitiensis (Lea, 1930)

Synonyms
- Eutinophaea vitiensis Lea, 1930

Genus of beetles

Leacis is a genus of beetle of the family Curculionidae. It is monotypic, being represented by the single species, Leacis vitiensis, which is found on Fiji.

== Description ==
Adults reach a length of about 2.6–2.8 mm (0.10–0.11 in). They are dark reddish-brown, with the antennae and legs paler. They are densely clothed with pale, fawn-coloured scales, mixed with chocolate-brown, and becoming paler on the underside.
