= Tachygonus lecontei =

Scientific classification
- Kingdom: Animalia
- Phylum: Arthropoda
- Class: Insecta
- Order: Coleoptera
- Suborder: Polyphaga
- Infraorder: Cucujiformia
- Family: Curculionidae
- Genus: Tachygonus
- Species: T. lecontei

Binomial name
- Tachygonus lecontei Gyllenhal, 1833

Synonyms
- Tachygonus bifasciculatus Champion, 1906; Tachygonus horridus Guerin-Meneville, 1844; Tachygonus spinipes Casey, 1897

Species of beetle

Tachygonus lecontei is a species of flea weevil in the beetle family Curculionidae. It is found in North America.
