= Weirius =

Scientific classification
- Kingdom: Animalia
- Phylum: Arthropoda
- Clade: Pancrustacea
- Class: Insecta
- Order: Coleoptera
- Suborder: Polyphaga
- Infraorder: Cucujiformia
- Family: Curculionidae
- Subfamily: Entiminae
- Tribe: Ottistirini
- Genus: Weirius; Oberprieler R.G. & Zimmerman, 2020
- Species: W. suturalis

Binomial name
- Weirius suturalis (Lea, 1930)

Synonyms
- Eutinophaea suturalis Lea, 1930

Genus of beetles

Weirius is a genus of beetle of the family Curculionidae. It is monotypic, being represented by the single species, Weirius suturalis, which is found in Australia (New South Wales, Queensland).

== Description ==
Adults reach a length of about 3.2–3.7 mm (0.13–0.15 in). They are dark reddish-brown, with the legs and antennae paler. They are densely clothed with greyish-white scales mottled with darker ones, becoming whitish, or with a faint bluish tinge, on the underside.
