= Reidius =

Scientific classification
- Kingdom: Animalia
- Phylum: Arthropoda
- Clade: Pancrustacea
- Class: Insecta
- Order: Coleoptera
- Suborder: Polyphaga
- Infraorder: Cucujiformia
- Superfamily: Curculionoidea
- Family: Curculionidae
- Subfamily: Entiminae
- Tribe: Ottistirini
- Genus: Reidius; Oberprieler & Zimmerman, 2020

Genus of beetles

Reidius is a genus of beetles belonging to the family Curculionidae.

== Species ==
- Reidius bicristatus (Lea, 1929)
- Reidius fasciculatus (Lea, 1930)
- Reidius setistriatus (Lea, 1930)
