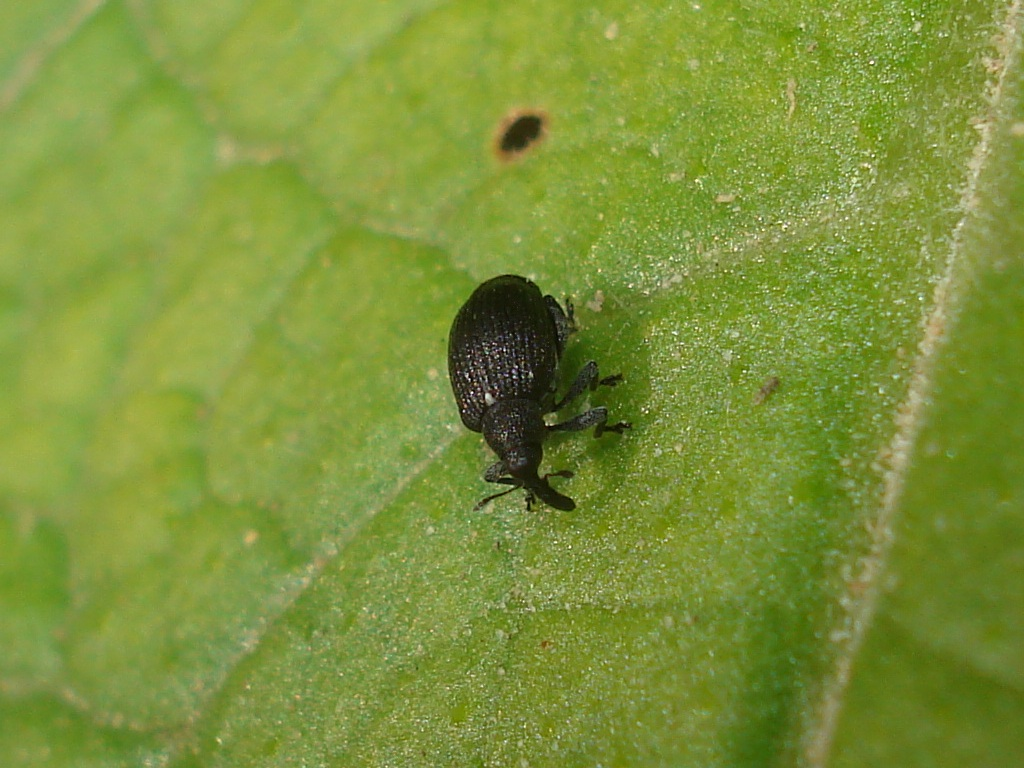

Scientific classification
- Kingdom: Animalia
- Phylum: Arthropoda
- Class: Insecta
- Order: Coleoptera
- Suborder: Polyphaga
- Infraorder: Cucujiformia
- Family: Curculionidae
- Genus: Tachyerges
- Species: T. stigma

Binomial name
- Tachyerges stigma (Germar, 1821)

= Tachyerges stigma =

Species of beetle

Tachyerges stigma is a species of weevil native to Europe.
