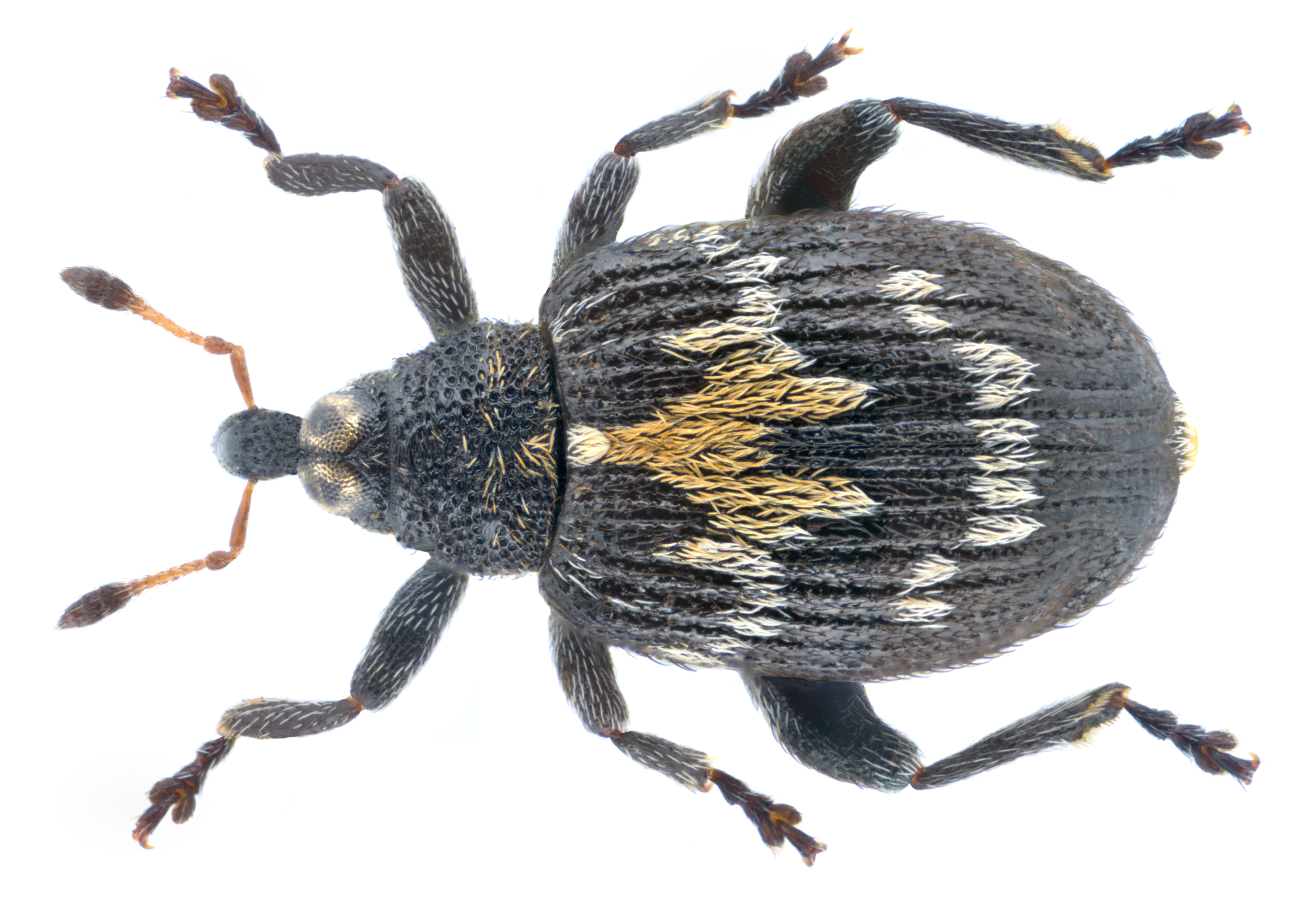
- Tachyerges salicis 2,5 mm (2,2-2,8 mm)

Scientific classification
- Kingdom: Animalia
- Phylum: Arthropoda
- Class: Insecta
- Order: Coleoptera
- Suborder: Polyphaga
- Infraorder: Cucujiformia
- Family: Curculionidae
- Genus: Tachyerges
- Species: T. salicis

Binomial name
- Tachyerges salicis (Linnaeus, 1758)

= Tachyerges salicis =

Species of beetle

Tachyerges salicis is a species of weevil native to Europe.
