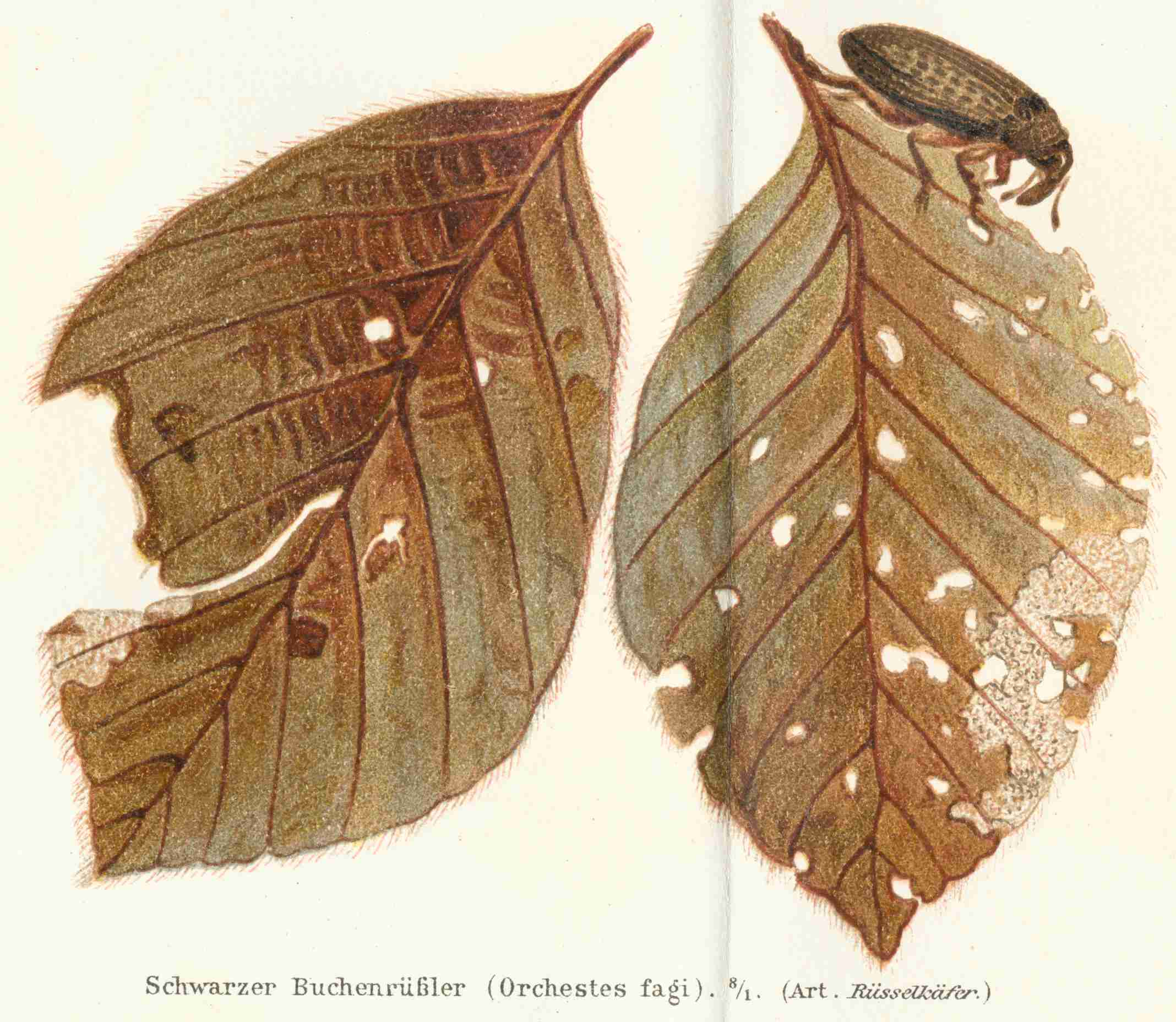
- Beech springer (Rhynchaenus fagi), also black beech rüssler (Orchestes fagi) / (Rhynchaenus fagi)

Scientific classification
- Kingdom: Animalia
- Phylum: Arthropoda
- Clade: Pancrustacea
- Class: Insecta
- Order: Coleoptera
- Suborder: Polyphaga
- Infraorder: Cucujiformia
- Superfamily: Curculionoidea
- Family: Curculionidae
- Tribe: Rhamphini
- Genus: Rhynchaenus; Illiger, 1798

Type species
- Curculio viminalis Fabricius, 1775

Species
- Rhynchaenus lonicerae; Rhynchaenus pacificus; Rhynchaenus xylostei

= Rhynchaenus =

Genus of beetles

Rhynchaenus is a genus of beetles alternatively placed in the subfamily Rhynchaeninae or in Curculioninae, of family Curculionidae. It previously included members of the genus Orchestes, but is now restricted to a vastly smaller group of species, all of which occur in Europe, Japan, or North Africa and feed on plants in the family Asteraceae. Reports of its occurrence in North America refer to Orchestes species.

== Taxonomy ==
A large number of species have been historically classified as Rhynchaenus, although nearly all former species now are placed in different genera.

== Literature cited ==
- Anderson, R.S. 1989. Revision of the subfamily Rhynchaeninae in North America (Coleoptera: Curculionidae) (subscription required). Transactions of the American Entomological Society 115(3):207–312.
- Anderson, R.S., O'Brien, C.W., Salsbury, G.A. and Krauth, S.J. 2007. Orchestes alni (L.) newly discovered in North America (Coleoptera: Curculionidae) (subscription required). Journal of the Kansas Entomological Society 80(1):78–79.
