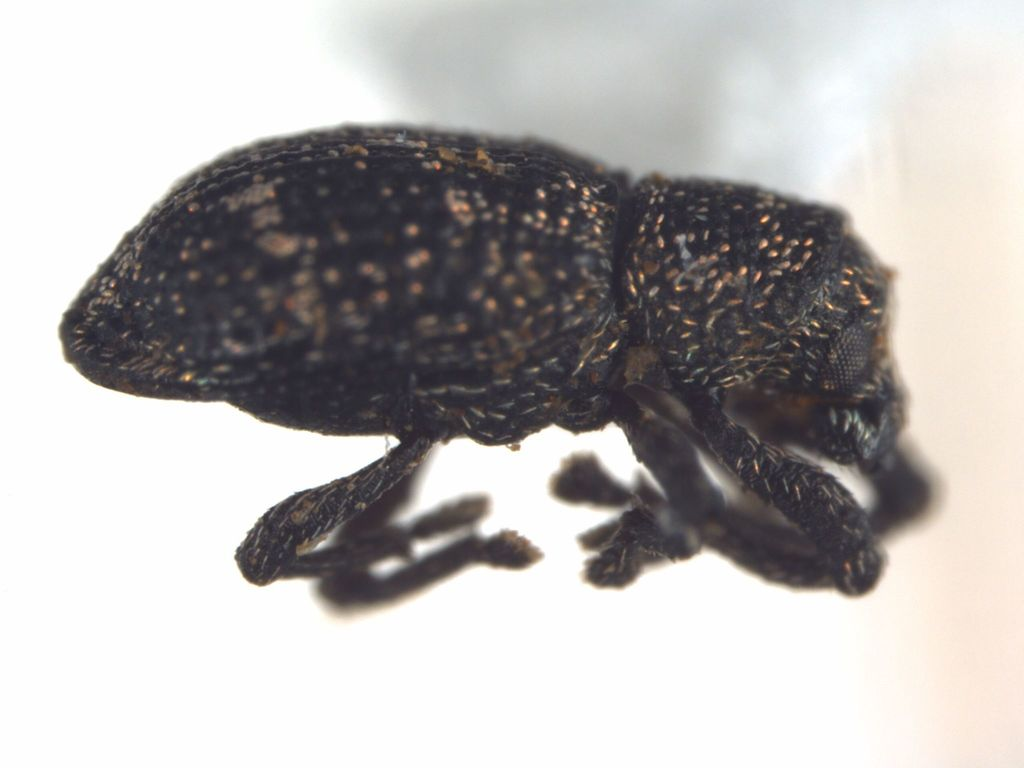

Scientific classification
- Kingdom: Animalia
- Phylum: Arthropoda
- Clade: Pancrustacea
- Class: Insecta
- Order: Coleoptera
- Suborder: Polyphaga
- Infraorder: Cucujiformia
- Superfamily: Curculionoidea
- Family: Curculionidae
- Genus: Viticis
- Species: V. bidentatus

Binomial name
- Viticis bidentatus Lea, 1930

= Viticis bidentatus =

Species of beetle

Viticis bidentatus is a species of beetle of the family Curculionidae. It is found on Fiji.

== Description ==
Adults reach a length of about 2.5 mm (0.098 in). They are black, with the scape and funicle reddish. They are moderately densely but irregularly clothed with ochreous scales.
