= Eutinophaea papuensis =

Scientific classification
- Kingdom: Animalia
- Phylum: Arthropoda
- Clade: Pancrustacea
- Class: Insecta
- Order: Coleoptera
- Suborder: Polyphaga
- Infraorder: Cucujiformia
- Superfamily: Curculionoidea
- Family: Curculionidae
- Genus: Eutinophaea
- Species: E. papuensis

Binomial name
- Eutinophaea papuensis Lea, 1930

Species of beetle

Eutinophaea papuensis is a species of beetle of the family Curculionidae. It is found in Papua New Guinea.

== Description ==
Adults reach a length of about 2.8–3 mm (0.11–0.12 in). They are blackish-brown, with the antennae and parts of the legs obscurely reddish. They are densely clothed with green and chocolate-brown scales.
