= Nesogenocis cucullatus =

Scientific classification
- Kingdom: Animalia
- Phylum: Arthropoda
- Clade: Pancrustacea
- Class: Insecta
- Order: Coleoptera
- Suborder: Polyphaga
- Infraorder: Cucujiformia
- Superfamily: Curculionoidea
- Family: Curculionidae
- Genus: Nesogenocis
- Species: N. cucullatus

Binomial name
- Nesogenocis cucullatus Lea, 1930

Species of beetle

Nesogenocis cucullatus is a species of beetle of the family Curculionidae. It is found on Fiji.

== Description ==
Adults reach a length of about 2.1–2.3 mm (0.083–0.091 in). They are dark-brown, with the legs and antennae paler. They are densely clothed with chocolate-brown and somewhat stramineous scales and they are sparsely setose.
