= Tachygonus centralis =

Scientific classification
- Domain: Eukaryota
- Kingdom: Animalia
- Phylum: Arthropoda
- Class: Insecta
- Order: Coleoptera
- Suborder: Polyphaga
- Infraorder: Cucujiformia
- Family: Curculionidae
- Genus: Tachygonus
- Species: T. centralis

Binomial name
- Tachygonus centralis LeConte, 1868

Synonyms
- Tachygonus nigrescens Blatchley, 1922

Species of beetle

Tachygonus centralis is a species of flea weevil in the beetle family Curculionidae. It is found in North America.
