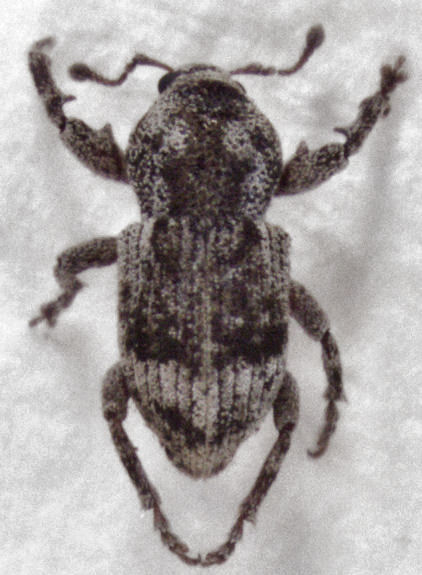
- Maleuterpes spinipes

Scientific classification
- Kingdom: Animalia
- Phylum: Arthropoda
- Clade: Pancrustacea
- Class: Insecta
- Order: Coleoptera
- Suborder: Polyphaga
- Infraorder: Cucujiformia
- Family: Curculionidae
- Subfamily: Entiminae
- Tribe: Ottistirini; Heller, 1925

= Ottistirini =

Tribe of beetles

Ottistirini is a weevil tribe in the beetle family Curculionidae. There are about 18 genera and more than 110 described species in Ottistirini. Most are found on Pacific islands, Australia, New Zealand, and Singapore.

== Genera ==
These 18 genera belong to the tribe Ottistirini:

- Atrotitis Heller, 1925 - Papua New Guinea
- Ecezius Thompson, 1982 - the Solomon Islands
- Eutinophaea Pascoe, 1870 - New Guinea, Australia, Indonesia
- Ittostira Heller, 1925 - Philippines, Singapore, Indonesia, Malaysia, Papua New Guinea, Taiwan
- Leacis Zimmerman, 1939 - Fiji
- Maleuterpes Blackburn, 1894 - New Caledonia, Australia, New Zealand
- Nesogenocis Lea, 1930 - Fiji
- Ottinychus Marshall, 1931 - Fiji, Samoa, Vanuatu
- Ottistira Pascoe, 1872 - Indonesia, Papua New Guinea, New Caledonia
- Ottistirellus Oberprieler R.G. & Zimmerman, 2020 - Australia
- Ottistirodes Oberprieler R.G. & Zimmerman, 2020 - Australia
- Reidius Oberprieler & Zimmerman, 2020 - Australia
- Schauenbergia Osella, 1977 - Réunion
- Syzygops Schoenherr, 1826 - Réunion, Mauritius
- Tistortia Heller, 1925 - Papua New Guinea
- Tistortiella Heller, 1925 - Papua New Guinea
- Tregoleus Oberprieler R.G. & Zimmerman, 2020 - Australia
- Viticis Lea, 1930
- Weirius Oberprieler R.G. & Zimmerman, 2020 - Australia
