= Ottistirodes =

Scientific classification
- Kingdom: Animalia
- Phylum: Arthropoda
- Clade: Pancrustacea
- Class: Insecta
- Order: Coleoptera
- Suborder: Polyphaga
- Infraorder: Cucujiformia
- Family: Curculionidae
- Subfamily: Entiminae
- Tribe: Ottistirini
- Genus: Ottistirodes; Oberprieler R.G. & Zimmerman, 2020
- Species: O. murinus

Binomial name
- Ottistirodes murinus (Lea, 1930)

Synonyms
- Eutinophaea murina Lea, 1930

Genus of beetles

Ottistirodes is a genus of beetle of the family Curculionidae. It is monotypic, being represented by the single species, Ottistirodes murinus, which is found in northern Australia.

== Description ==
Adults reach a length of about 5–7 mm (0.20–0.28 in). They are black, with parts of the antennae and part of the legs obscurely reddish. They are densely clothed with mouse-coloured scales, changing to whitish on the underside.
