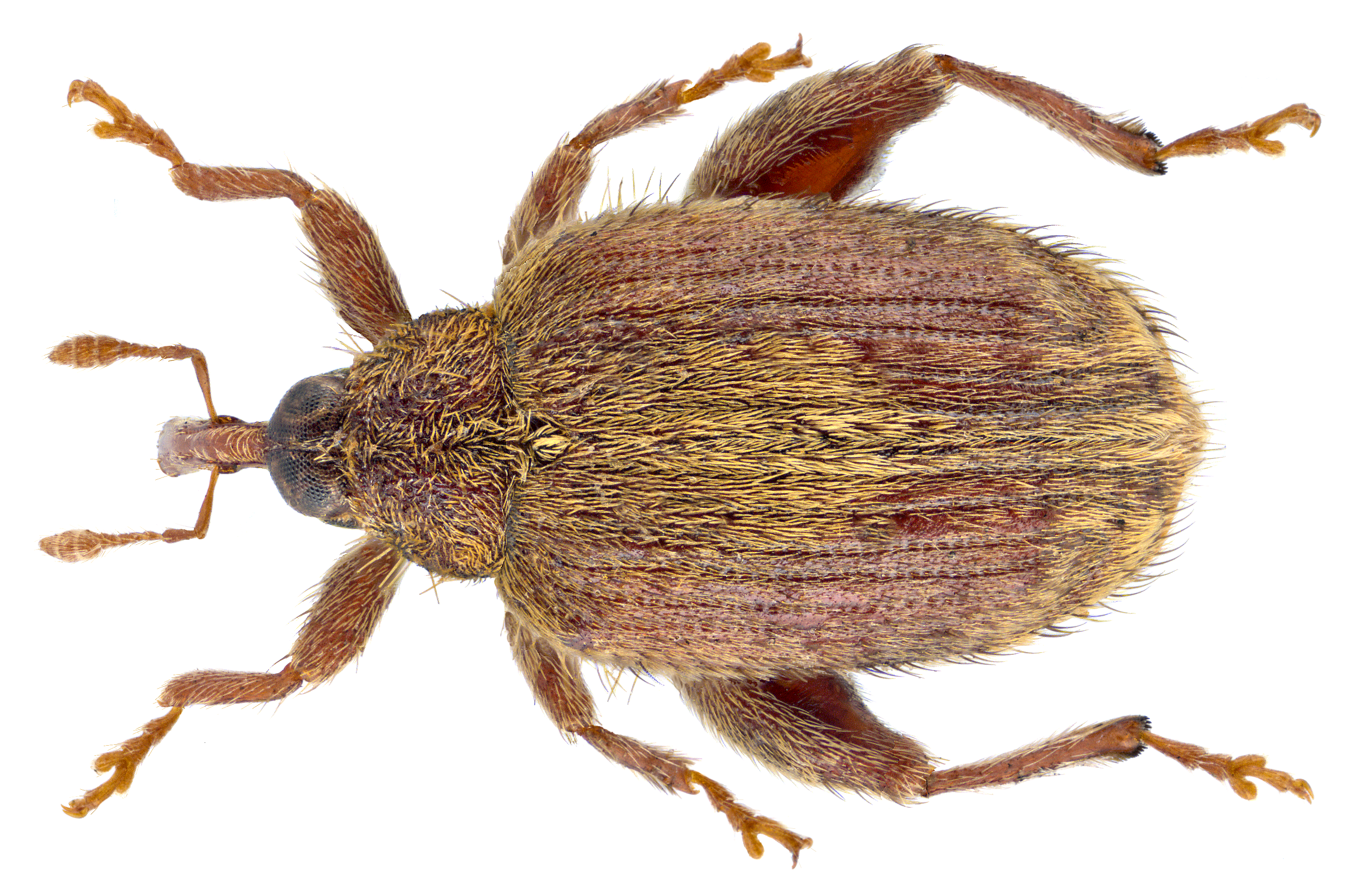
- Orchestes quercus 3,7 mm (2,7-3,7 mm)

Scientific classification
- Kingdom: Animalia
- Phylum: Arthropoda
- Class: Insecta
- Order: Coleoptera
- Suborder: Polyphaga
- Infraorder: Cucujiformia
- Family: Curculionidae
- Genus: Orchestes
- Species: O. quercus

Binomial name
- Orchestes quercus (Linnaeus, 1758)

= Orchestes quercus =

Species of beetle

Orchestes quercus is a species of weevil native to Europe.
