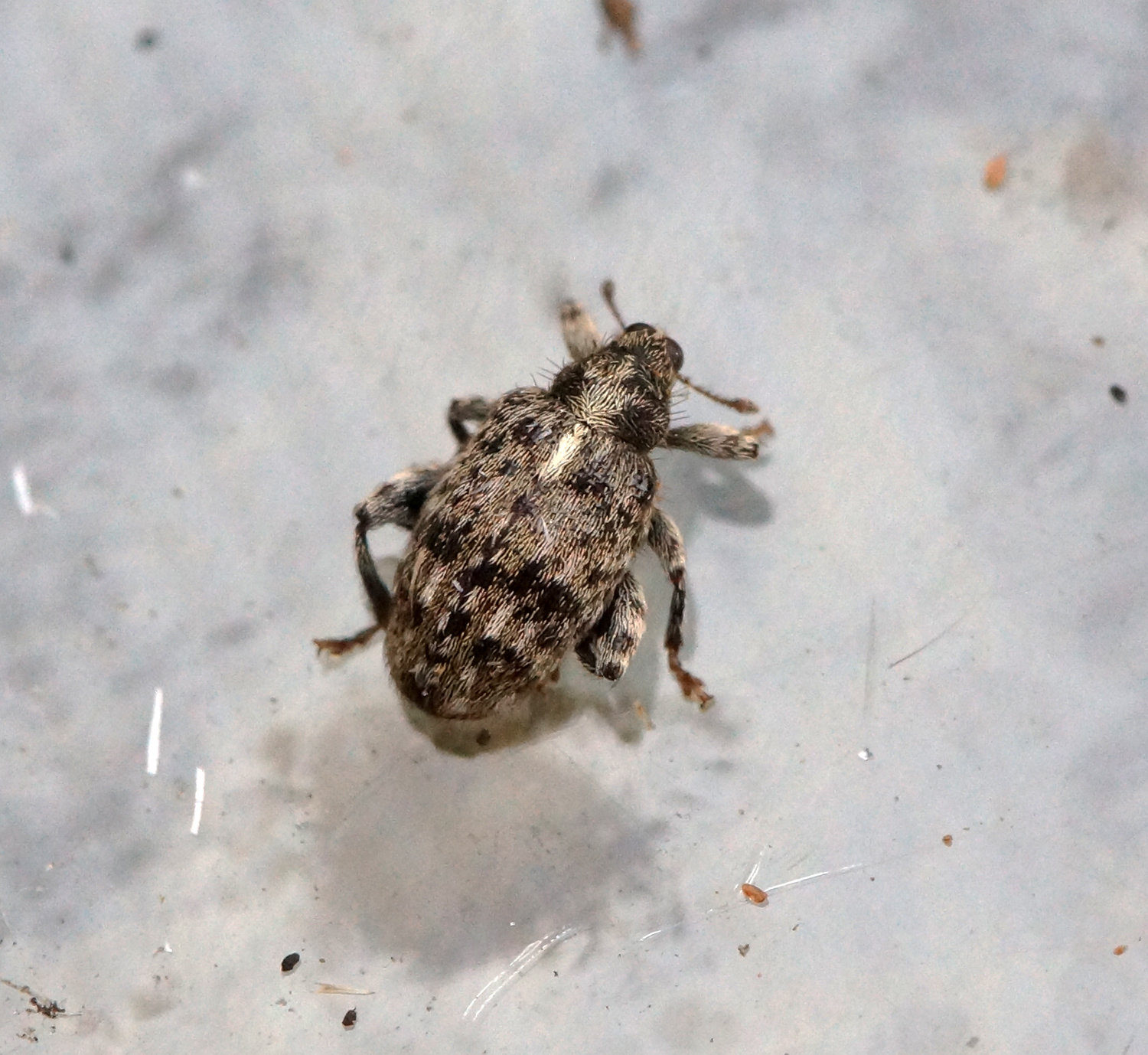

Scientific classification
- Domain: Eukaryota
- Kingdom: Animalia
- Phylum: Arthropoda
- Class: Insecta
- Order: Coleoptera
- Suborder: Polyphaga
- Infraorder: Cucujiformia
- Family: Curculionidae
- Genus: Orchestes
- Species: O. pilosus

Binomial name
- Orchestes pilosus (Fabricius, 1781)

Synonyms
- List: Curculio pilosus Fabricius, 1781; Curculio ilicis Fabricius, 1787; Curculio saltatorsegetis De Geer, 1775; Rhynchaenus pilosus (Fabricius, 1781); Orchestes pilosus (Fabricius, 1781)

= Orchestes pilosus =

Species of beetle

Orchestes pilosus is a beetle of the family Curculionidae found in Europe. It was first described by Johan Christian Fabricius in 1781. The larvae are leaf miners on oak (Quercus species).

The mines are at the edge of a leaf, between two lobes and are found from April to June on the following species; Turkey oak (Quercus cerris), holm oak (Quercus ilex), sessile oak (Quercus petraea), downy oak (Quercus pubescens) and pedunculate oak (Quercus robur). The mines of Dyseriocrania subpurpurella are similar but when mature are much larger and not as dark, because the frass in O. pilosus mines stick to the inner surface of the mine.
