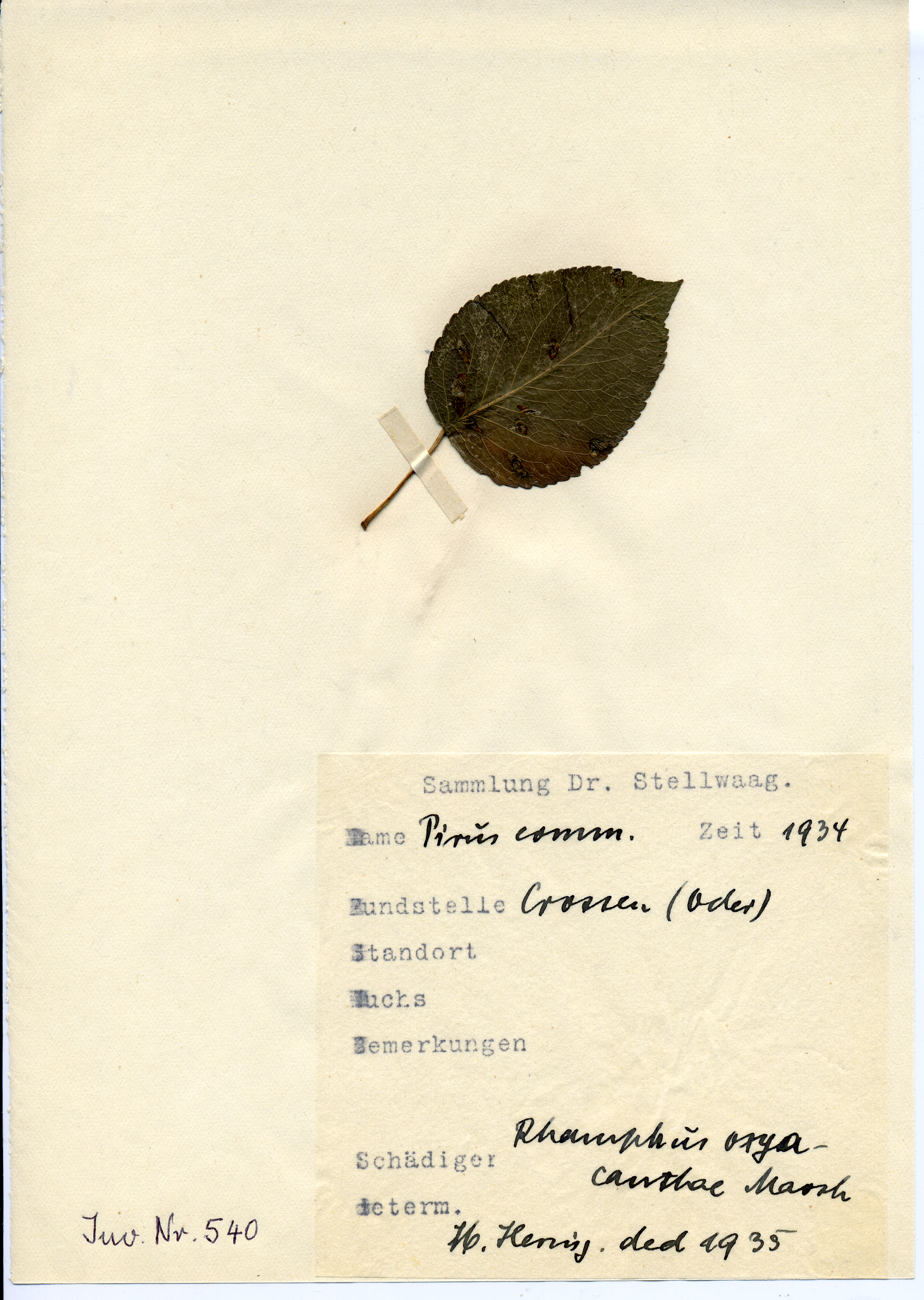
- Rhamphus oxyacanthae Leaf-mark on Pyrus communis (Rosaceae)

Scientific classification
- Kingdom: Animalia
- Phylum: Arthropoda
- Class: Insecta
- Order: Coleoptera
- Suborder: Polyphaga
- Infraorder: Cucujiformia
- Family: Curculionidae
- Genus: Rhamphus
- Species: R. oxyacanthae

Binomial name
- Rhamphus oxyacanthae (T.Marsham, 1802)

= Rhamphus oxyacanthae =

Species of beetle

Rhamphus oxyacanthae is a species of weevil native to Europe.
