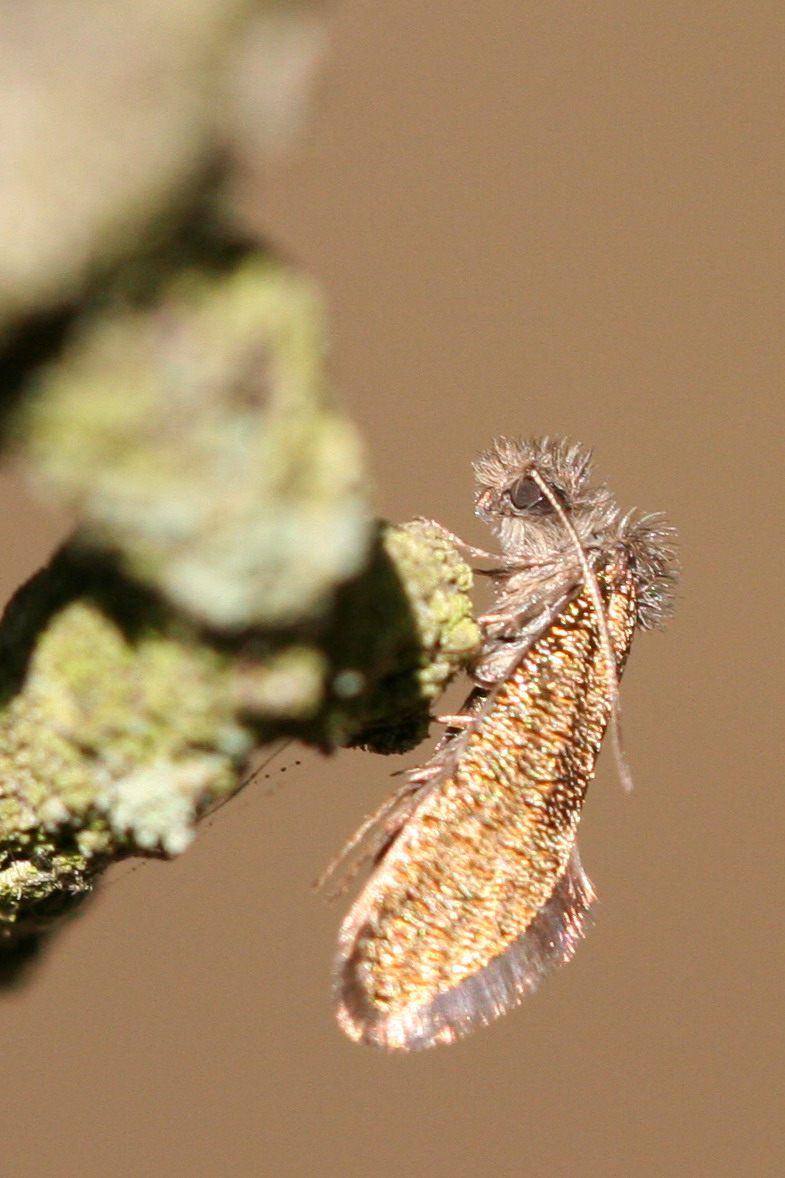

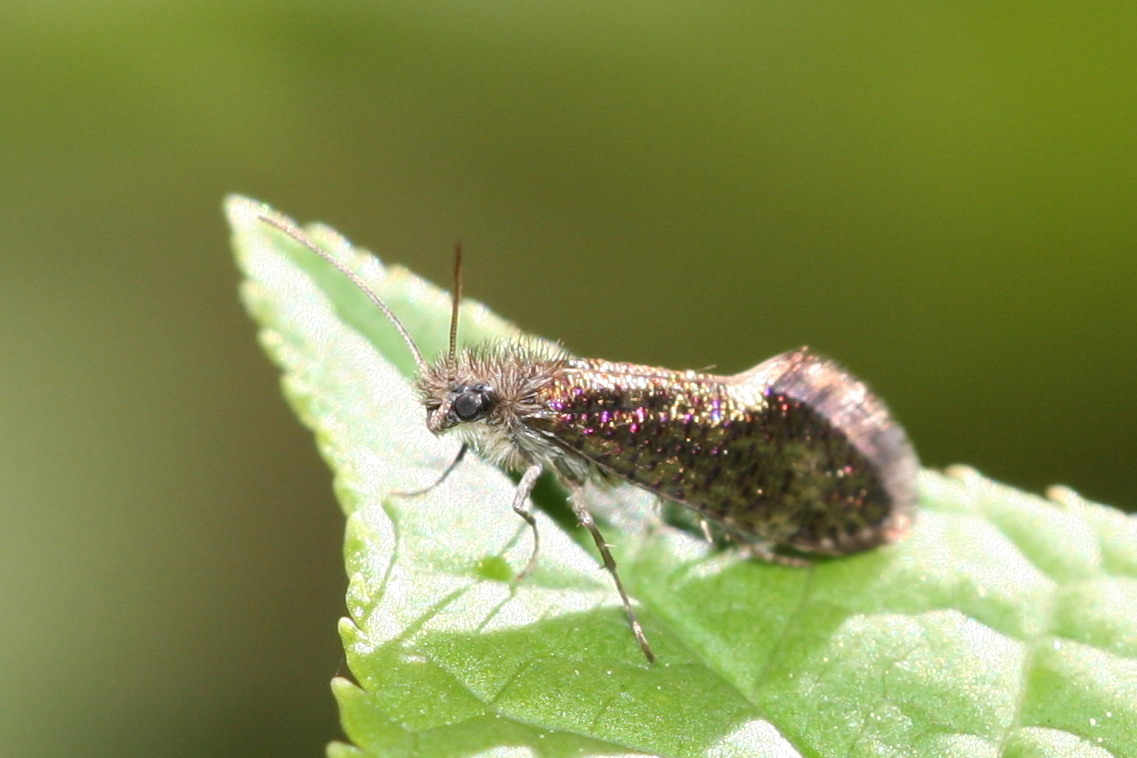

Scientific classification
- Domain: Eukaryota
- Kingdom: Animalia
- Phylum: Arthropoda
- Class: Insecta
- Order: Lepidoptera
- Family: Eriocraniidae
- Genus: Dyseriocrania
- Species: D. subpurpurella

Binomial name
- Dyseriocrania subpurpurella (Haworth, 1828)

Synonyms
- List: Tinea subpurpurella Haworth, 1828; Eriocrania subpurpurella; Micropteryx fastuosella Zeller, 1839; Micropterix fastuosella; Eriocrania fastuosella; Dyseriocrania fastuosella

= Dyseriocrania subpurpurella =

Moth species in family Eriocraniidae

Dyseriocrania subpurpurella is a diurnal moth from the family Eriocraniidae, found in most of Europe. The moth was first named by the English entomologist, Adrian Hardy Haworth in 1828.

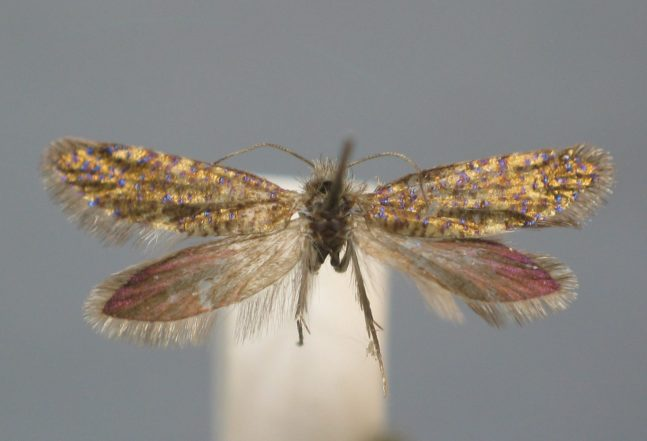

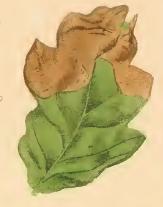
A mined oak leaf

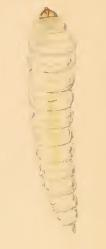
Larva

== Description ==
The wingspan of the moth ranges from 9–14 mm. The wings are metallic gold with sapphire-blue and ruby-red dots (strigulae) and an indistinct obscurely paler dorsal spot before tornus. The hindwings are brassy-grey, posteriorly purplish-tinged and like the forewings have grey cilia. The head is ochreous-grey-whitish mixed with dark fuscous. The moths are on the wing in April and May, fly on sunny days and come to light. On dull days they rest on the trunks and branches of oak. They do not feed.

Sub-species

- Form fastuosella – is a more richly marked sub-species with purple spots or striations.

Ovum

Eggs are laid within the leaf tissue of oak (Quercus species), approximately 2 mm from the leaf margin.

Larva

The caterpillar is whitish with a pale-brown head. It lives inside the leaves of Quercus (oak) species making a blotch mine with ″spaghetti like″ frass from May to July. Initially the mine is a narrow corridor circa 5 mm wide and is mostly filled with granular frass. The corridor (or gallery) abruptly widens into a large, full depth, dirty-whitish blotch which is on the leaf margin. The frass within the blotch is in long threads. If several eggs are laid on the same leaf, the mines join together with several larvae in the enlarged blotch. The mine is similar to that of the beetle, Orchestes pilosus, but the beetle's mine is small and darker when fully formed.

Host plants include Turkey oak (Quercus cerris), sessile oak (Quercus petraea), downy oak (Quercus pubescens), Pyrenean oak (Quercus pyrenaica), pedunculate oak (Quercus robur), northern red oak (Quercus rubra) and sweet chestnut (Castanea sativa).

Pupa

The larva forms a tough silken cocoon in the soil, which can be found from July to April.

== Distribution ==
The moth has been recorded from most European countries except Bulgaria, Croatia, Cyprus, Faroe Islands, Iceland, Malta and Slovenia.

== Etymology ==
The moth was originally named Tinea subpurpurella by Adrian Haworth, from a specimen found in Coomb Wood [sic], England. The genus Tinea, was raised by the Swedish taxonomist Carl Linnaeus and means "a gnawing worm". Until recently, the moth was in the genus Eriocrania, which was raised by Philipp Christoph Zeller in 1851. Erion means wool and kranion means the upper part of the head, which refers to the hair-scales on the top of the head. The moth is now in the genus Dyseriocrania. The specific name refers to the purple colouration of the forewing on part of the wing.

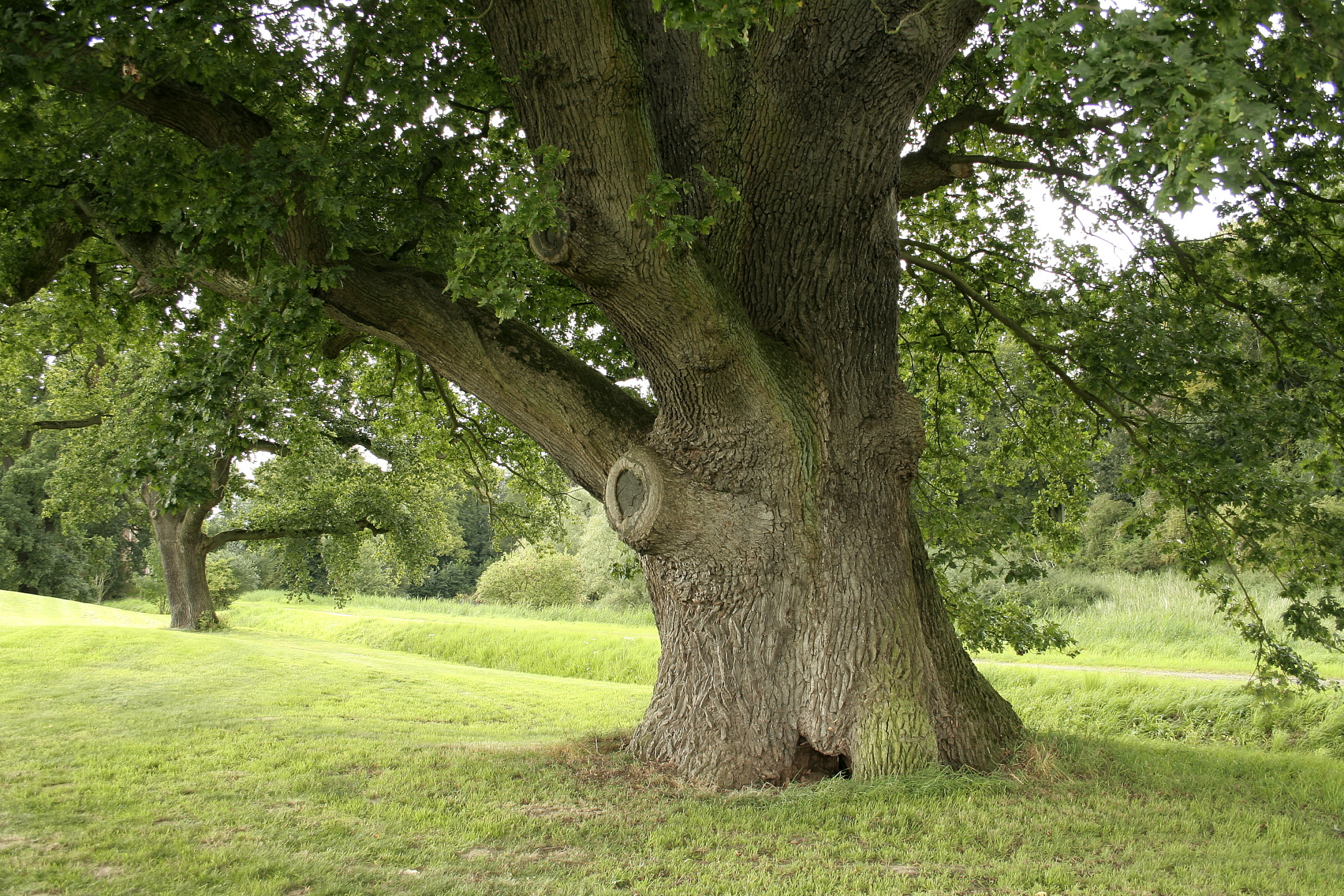
Habitat, England
