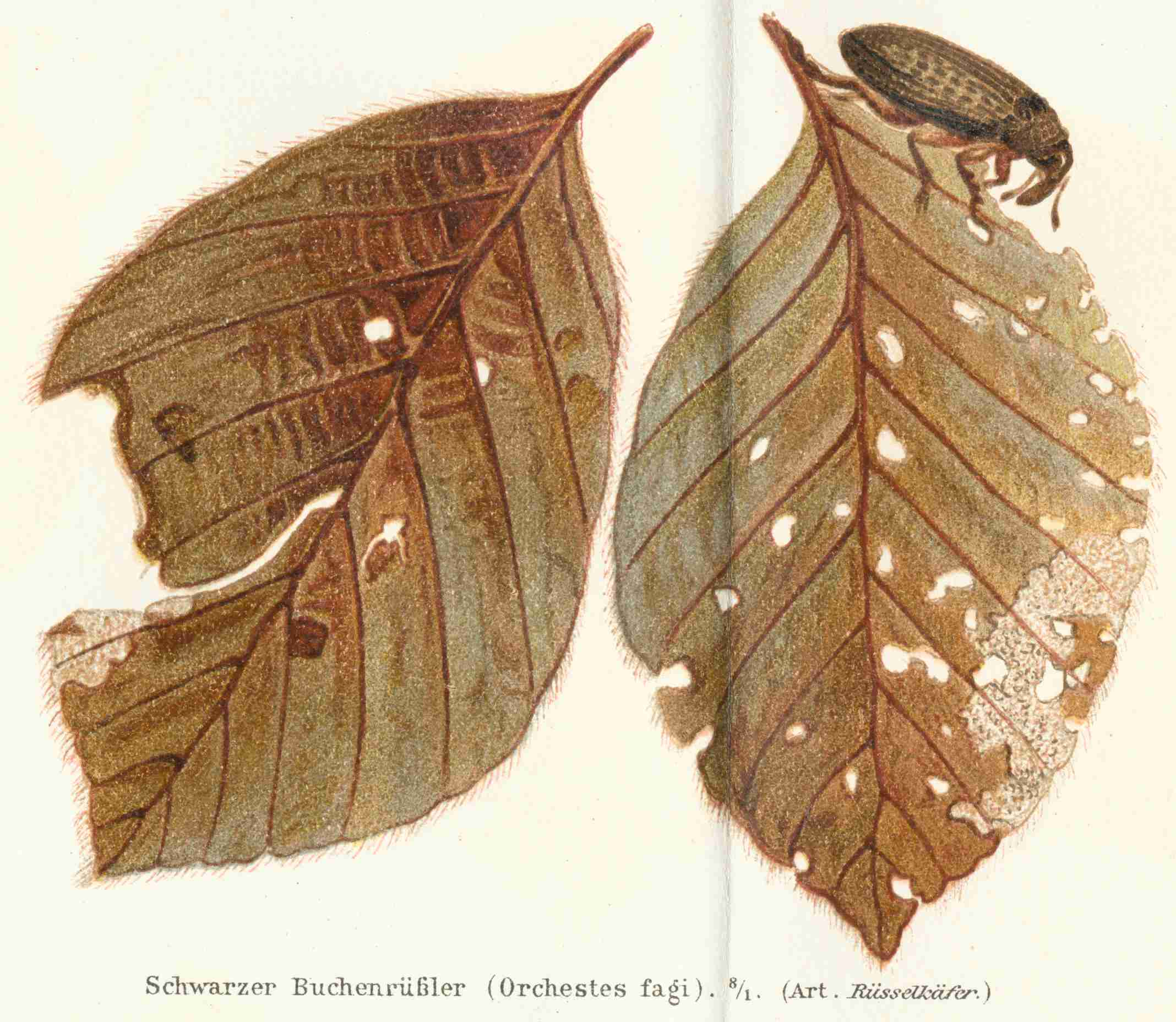
- Rhynchaenus fagi

Scientific classification
- Domain: Eukaryota
- Kingdom: Animalia
- Phylum: Arthropoda
- Class: Insecta
- Order: Coleoptera
- Suborder: Polyphaga
- Infraorder: Cucujiformia
- Family: Curculionidae
- Subfamily: Curculioninae
- Tribe: Rhamphini; Rafinesque, 1815

Subtribes
- Dinorhopalina Voss, 1936 Ixalmina Voss, 1936 Rhamphina Rafinesque, 1815 Tachygonina Lacordaire, 1865

= Rhamphini =

Tribe of beetles

Rhamphini is a weevil tribe in the subfamily Curculioninae.

== Genera ==
- Dinorhopala Pascoe, 1860
- Imachra F.P.Pascoe, 1874
- Indodinorrhopalus Indodinorrhopalus H.R.Pajni & S.Sood, 1981
- Isochnus C.G.Thomson, 1859
- Ixalma F.P.Pascoe, 1871
- Laemorchestes G.C.Champion, 1903
- Macrorhynchaenus A.Hustache, 1933
- Megorchestes
- Morimotonomizo H.Kojima, 1997
- Orchestes Illiger, 1798
- Pritmus Pajni & Sood, 1981
- Pseudendaeus Voss, 1960
- Rhamphonyx E.Voss, 1964
- Rhamphus Clairville 1798
- Rhynchaenophaenus E.Voss, 1956
- Rhynchaenus Clairville 1798
- Sphaerorchestes K.Morimoto & S.Miyakawa, 1996
- Strabonus Kuschel, 2008
- Synorchestes E.Voss, 1958
- Tachyerges Schénherr, 1825
- Tachygonidius Champion, 1907
- Tachygonus Guérin-Ménéville, 1833
- Technites C.J.Schoenherr, 1843
- Viticis Lea & A.M., 1930
