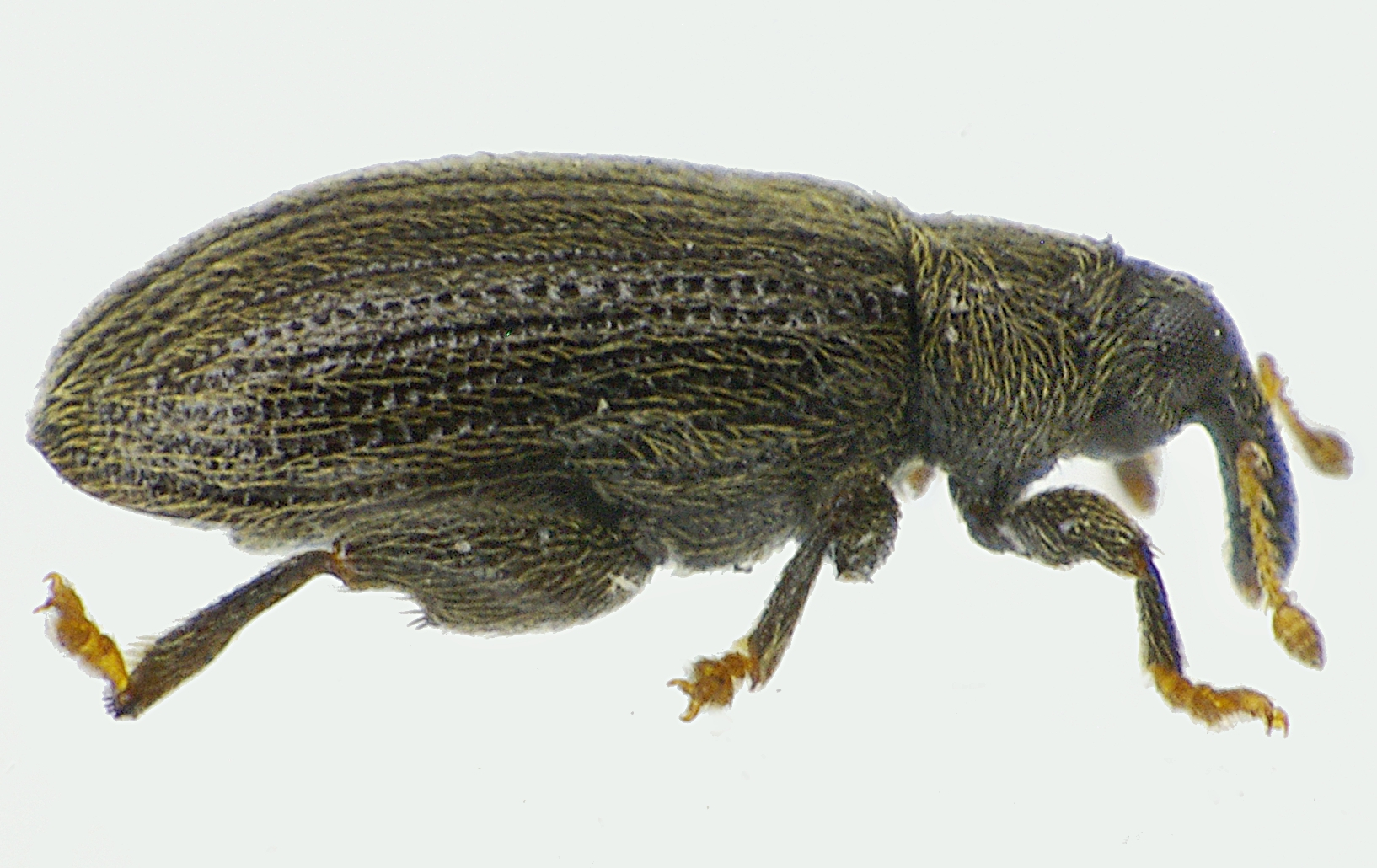

Scientific classification
- Kingdom: Animalia
- Phylum: Arthropoda
- Class: Insecta
- Order: Coleoptera
- Suborder: Polyphaga
- Infraorder: Cucujiformia
- Family: Curculionidae
- Genus: Orchestes
- Species: O. fagi

Binomial name
- Orchestes fagi (Linnaeus, 1758)

= Orchestes fagi =

Species of beetle

Orchestes fagi , beech leaf-miner beetle, is a species of weevil native to Europe. The larvae mine the leaves of beech (Fagus species). It is an invasive species in Canada where it is damaging to American beech.
