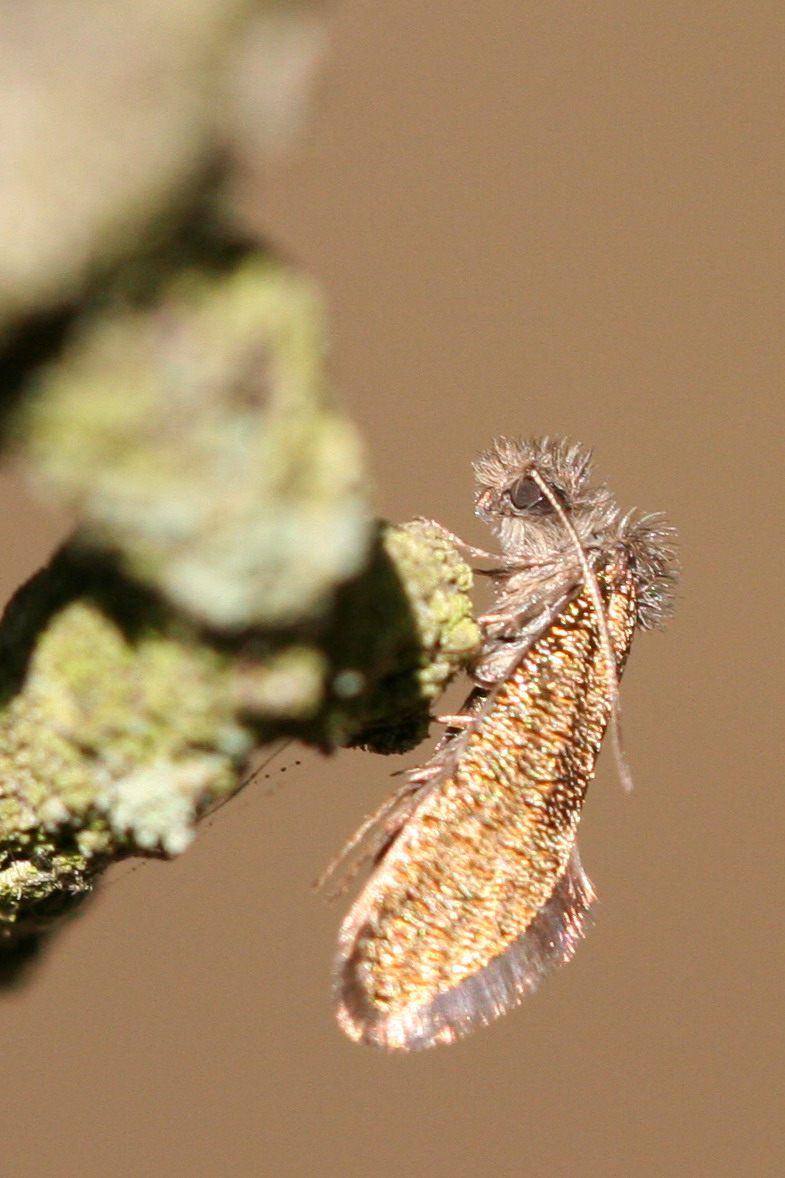
- Dyseriocrania subpurpurella

Scientific classification
- Domain: Eukaryota
- Kingdom: Animalia
- Phylum: Arthropoda
- Class: Insecta
- Order: Lepidoptera
- Family: Eriocraniidae
- Genus: Dyseriocrania; Spuler, 1910

Species
- 4 species (see text)

Synonyms
- Mnemonica Meyrick, 1912

= Dyseriocrania =

Moth genus in family Eriocraniidae

Dyseriocrania is a genus of moth of the family Eriocraniidae. The genus has a Holarctic distribution.

Dyseriocrania are small moths (wingspan 9–13 mm (0.35–0.51 in)) with relatively broad wings.

== Species ==
There are four recognized species:

- Dyseriocrania auricyanea (Walsingham, 1882)
- Dyseriocrania ermolaevi Kozlov, 1983
- Dyseriocrania griseocapitella (Walsingham, 1898)
- Dyseriocrania subpurpurella (Haworth, 1828)
