= Orchestes testaceus =

Scientific classification
- Domain: Eukaryota
- Kingdom: Animalia
- Phylum: Arthropoda
- Class: Insecta
- Order: Coleoptera
- Suborder: Polyphaga
- Infraorder: Cucujiformia
- Family: Curculionidae
- Genus: Orchestes
- Species: O. testaceus

Binomial name
- Orchestes testaceus (Muller, 1776)

Species of beetle

Orchestes testaceus, known generally as the alder flea weevil or alder jumping weevil, is a species of flea weevil in the family Curculionidae.
