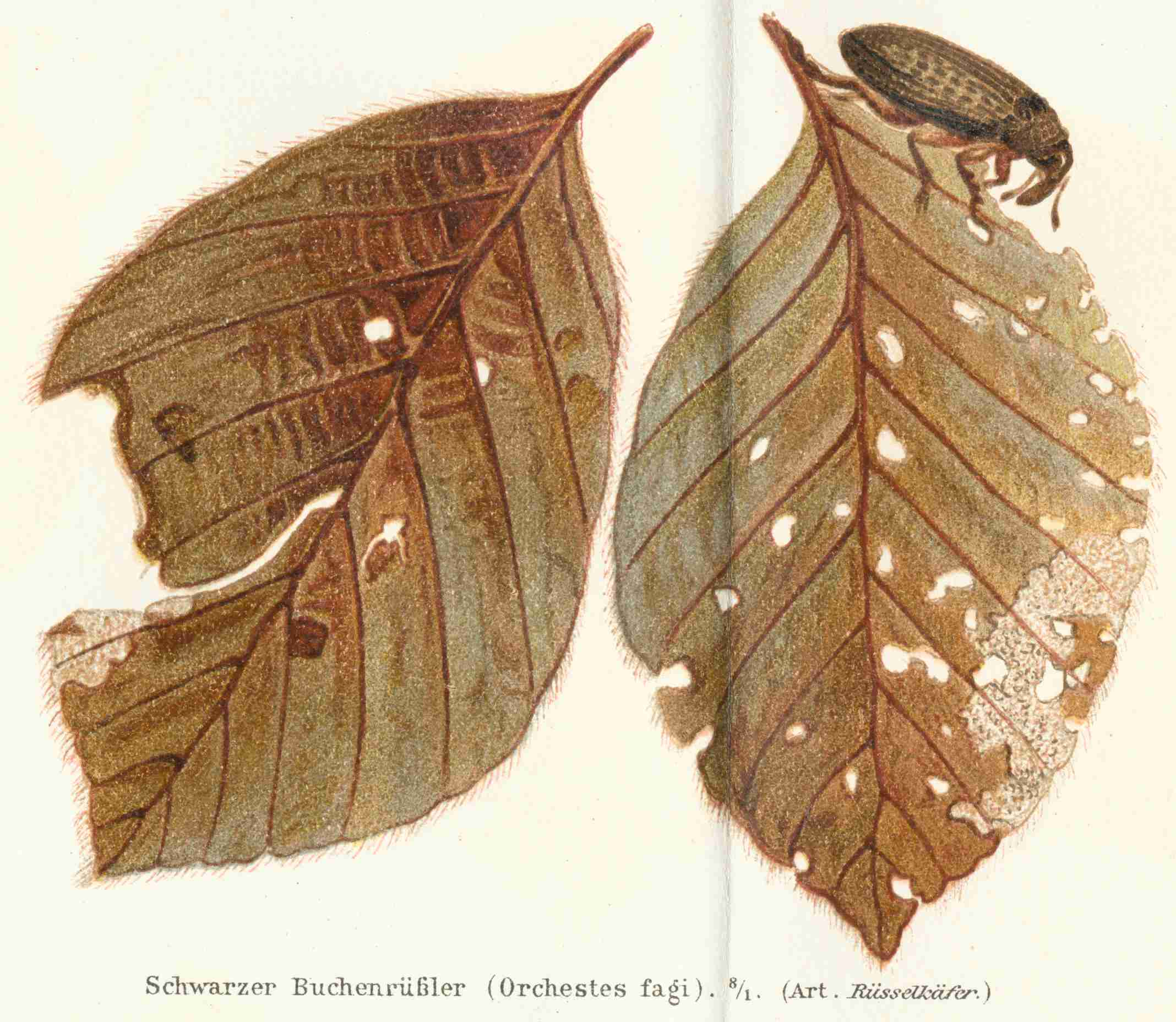
- Orchestes fagi

Scientific classification
- Kingdom: Animalia
- Phylum: Arthropoda
- Class: Insecta
- Order: Coleoptera
- Suborder: Polyphaga
- Infraorder: Cucujiformia
- Family: Curculionidae
- Subfamily: Curculioninae
- Tribe: Rhamphini
- Subtribe: Rhamphina
- Genus: Orchestes; Illiger, 1798

Type species
- Curculio viminalis Fabricius, 1775

= Orchestes =

Genus of beetles

Orchestes is a genus of beetles either classified in the subfamily Rhynchaeninae or in the tribe Rhamphini of the subfamily Curculioninae, of the family Curculionidae. It encompasses six species in North America, including Orchestes steppensis, and more in Eurasia. It was previously regarded as a synonym of Rhynchaenus, which is now used with a much more restricted definition. The name Pedetes (normally used for the springhares) has been used as a manuscript name for this genus around 1799, but not published as a valid name.

== Species ==
- Orchestes affinis
- Orchestes africanus
- Orchestes alboscutellatus
- Orchestes alni
- Orchestes amplithorax
- Orchestes amurensis
- Orchestes angustifrons
- Orchestes animosus
- Orchestes anoploidens
- Orchestes aterrimus
- Orchestes atricapillus
- Orchestes australiae
- Orchestes avellanae
- Orchestes betuleti
- Orchestes bifasciatus
- Orchestes bimaculatus
- Orchestes calcar
- Orchestes calceatus
- Orchestes camerunicus
- Orchestes carnifex
- Orchestes cinereus
- Orchestes confinis
- Orchestes confundatus
- Orchestes crassus
- Orchestes crinitus
- Orchestes decoratus
- Orchestes depressus
- Orchestes distans
- Orchestes ephippiatus
- Orchestes erythropus
- Orchestes fagi
- Orchestes fasciculatus
- Orchestes ferrugineus
- Orchestes flavescens
- Orchestes flavus
- Orchestes foedatus
- Orchestes fragariae
- Orchestes harunire
- Orchestes haematicus
- Orchestes horii
- Orchestes horridus
- Orchestes hortorum
- Orchestes hustachei
- Orchestes ilicis
- Orchestes illinoisensis
- Orchestes japonicus
- Orchestes jota
- Orchestes koltzei
- Orchestes lateritius
- Orchestes lecontei
- Orchestes lonicerae
- Orchestes maurus
- Orchestes melancholicus
- Orchestes melanocephalus
- Orchestes mixtus
- Orchestes mollis
- Orchestes monedula
- Orchestes mutabilis
- Orchestes nigricollis
- Orchestes nigriventris
- Orchestes nitens
- Orchestes ornatus
- Orchestes pacificus
- Orchestes pallicornis
- Orchestes pallidior
- Orchestes peregrinus
- Orchestes perpusillus
- Orchestes pilosus
- Orchestes plantaris
- Orchestes populi
- Orchestes pratensis
- Orchestes puberulus
- Orchestes pubescens
- Orchestes pulicarius
- Orchestes quercus
- Orchestes rhodopus
- Orchestes rufescens
- Orchestes ruficornis
- Orchestes rufipennis
- Orchestes rufitarsis
- Orchestes rufus
- Orchestes rugosus
- Orchestes rusci
- Orchestes saliceti
- Orchestes salicis
- Orchestes salicola
- Orchestes sanguinipes
- Orchestes scitus
- Orchestes scutellaris
- Orchestes semirufus
- Orchestes signatus
- Orchestes signifer
- Orchestes similis
- Orchestes sparsus
- Orchestes spinosus
- Orchestes steppensis
- Orchestes stigma
- Orchestes subfasciatus
- Orchestes suturalis
- Orchestes testaceus
- Orchestes tomentosus
- Orchestes uniformis
- Orchestes waltoni
- Orchestes weidenbachianus
- Orchestes vestitus
- Orchestes viminalis
- Orchestes x-album

== Literature cited ==
- Anderson, R.S. 1989. Revision of the subfamily Rhynchaeninae in North America (Coleoptera: Curculionidae) (subscription required). Transactions of the American Entomological Society 115(3):207–312.
- Anderson, R.S., O'Brien, C.W., Salsbury, G.A. and Krauth, S.J. 2007. Orchestes alni (L.) newly discovered in North America (Coleoptera: Curculionidae) (subscription required). Journal of the Kansas Entomological Society 80(1):78–79.
- Creutzer, C. 1799. Entomologische Versuche. Schaumburg und comp.
- Crotch, G.R. 1870. The genera of Coleoptera studied chronologically (1735–1801). Transactions of the Royal Entomological Society of London 1870(1):41–52.
