= Reidius setistriatus =

Scientific classification
- Kingdom: Animalia
- Phylum: Arthropoda
- Clade: Pancrustacea
- Class: Insecta
- Order: Coleoptera
- Suborder: Polyphaga
- Infraorder: Cucujiformia
- Superfamily: Curculionoidea
- Family: Curculionidae
- Genus: Reidius
- Species: R. setistriatus

Binomial name
- Reidius setistriatus (Lea, 1930)

Synonyms
- Eutinophaea setistriata Lea, 1930

Species of beetle

Reidius setistriatus is a species of beetle of the family Curculionidae. It is found in Australia (Queensland).

== Description ==
Adults reach a length of about 3–3.5 mm (0.12–0.14 in). They are reddish-brown, with the legs and antennae paler. They are densely clothed with pale scales, mixed with pale brown markings. The underside has whitish scales. There are rows of setae found on the elytra.
