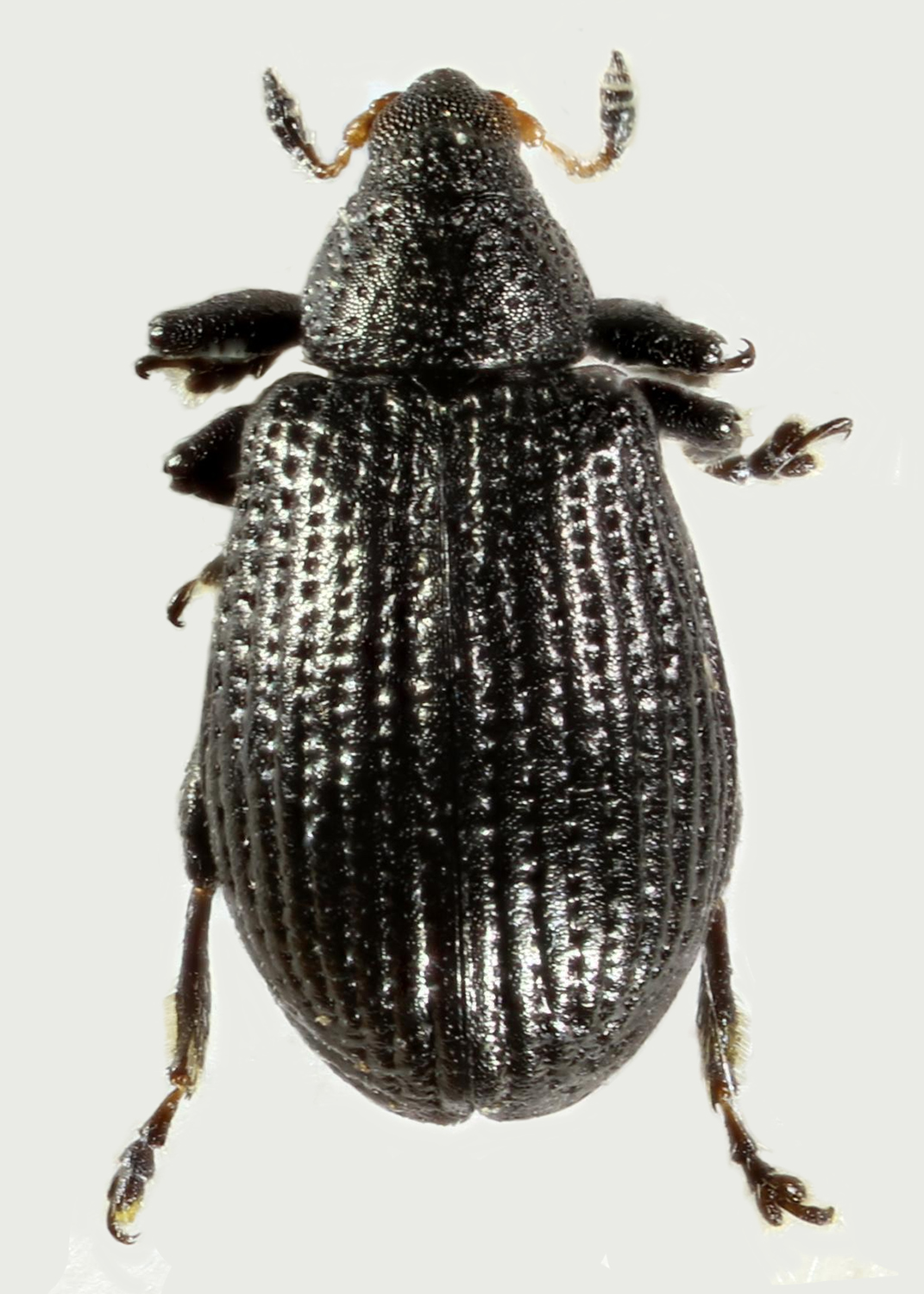
- Rhamphus pulicarius, Lake Elsi, North Wales

Scientific classification
- Kingdom: Animalia
- Phylum: Arthropoda
- Class: Insecta
- Order: Coleoptera
- Suborder: Polyphaga
- Infraorder: Cucujiformia
- Family: Curculionidae
- Tribe: Rhamphini
- Genus: Rhamphus; Clairville, 1798

= Rhamphus =

Genus of beetles

Rhamphus is a genus of beetles belonging to the family Curculionidae.

The species of this genus are found in Europe, Japan and Australia.

Species:

- Rhamphus oxyacanthae
- Rhamphus pulicarius
