= Nesogenocis =

Scientific classification
- Kingdom: Animalia
- Phylum: Arthropoda
- Clade: Pancrustacea
- Class: Insecta
- Order: Coleoptera
- Suborder: Polyphaga
- Infraorder: Cucujiformia
- Superfamily: Curculionoidea
- Family: Curculionidae
- Subfamily: Entiminae
- Tribe: Ottistirini
- Genus: Nesogenocis; Lea, 1930

Genus of beetles

Nesogenocis is a genus of beetles belonging to the family Curculionidae.

== Species ==
- Nesogenocis cucullatus Lea, 1930
- Nesogenocis maculosus Zimmerman, 1943
