= Viticis =

Scientific classification
- Kingdom: Animalia
- Phylum: Arthropoda
- Clade: Pancrustacea
- Class: Insecta
- Order: Coleoptera
- Suborder: Polyphaga
- Infraorder: Cucujiformia
- Superfamily: Curculionoidea
- Family: Curculionidae
- Subfamily: Entiminae
- Tribe: Ottistirini
- Genus: Viticis; Lea, 1930

Genus of beetles

Viticis is a genus of beetles belonging to the family Curculionidae.

== Species ==
- Viticis aspersus Kuschel in Grandcolas, 2008
- Viticis bidentatus Lea, 1930
- Viticis guamae Zimmerman, 1942
- Viticis maculosus Zimmerman, 1940
- Viticis marquesanus Zimmerman, 1963
