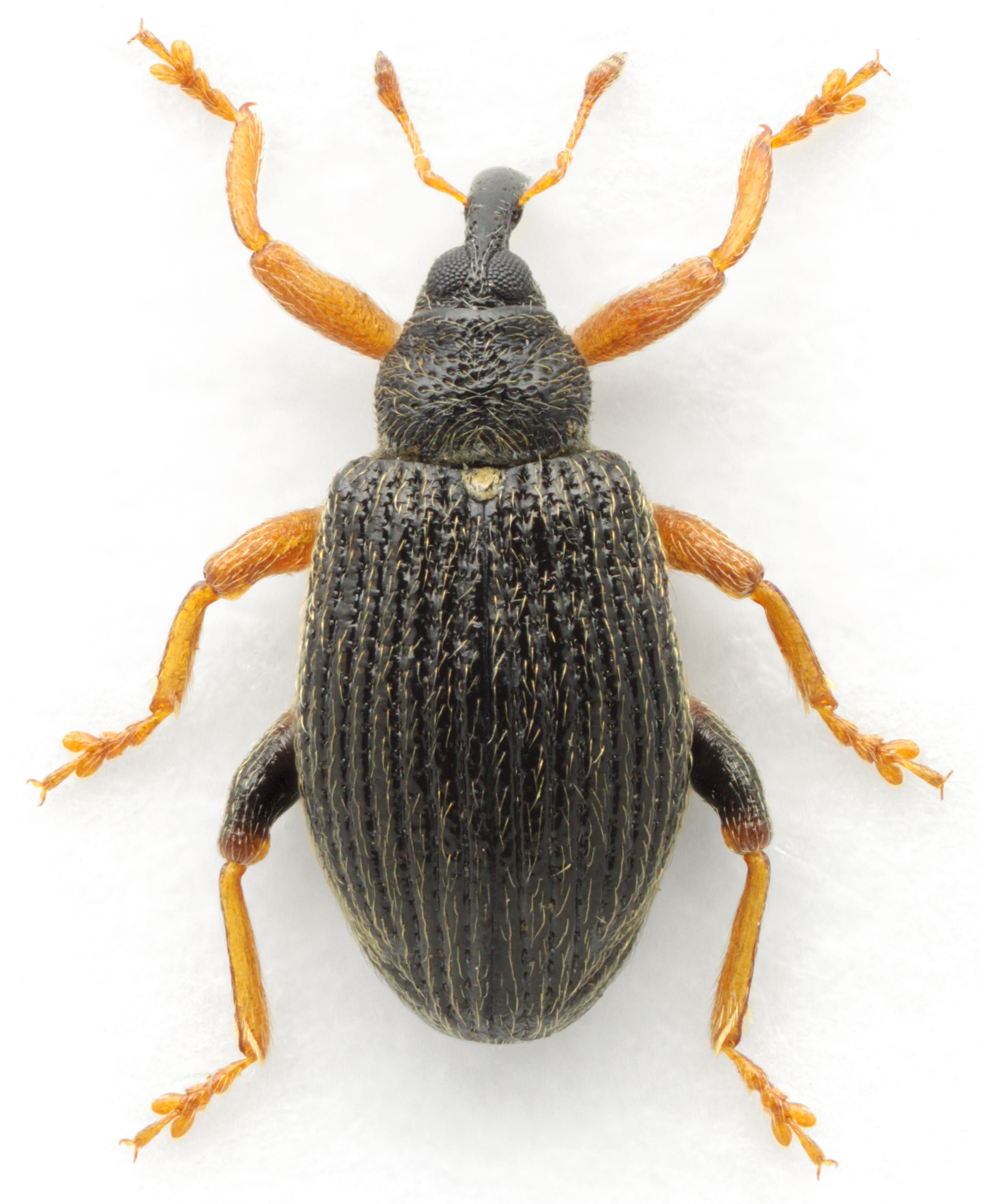
- Isochnus sequensi

Scientific classification
- Domain: Eukaryota
- Kingdom: Animalia
- Phylum: Arthropoda
- Class: Insecta
- Order: Coleoptera
- Suborder: Polyphaga
- Infraorder: Cucujiformia
- Family: Curculionidae
- Genus: Isochnus; Thompson, 1859

= Isochnus =

Genus of beetles

Isochnus is a genus of beetles belonging to the family Curculionidae.

The species of this genus are found in Europe and Northern America.

Species:

- Isochnus angustifrons (A.Hustache, 1931)
- Isochnus arcticus (Korotyaev, 1976)
- Isochnus flagellum (Erichson, 1902)
- Isochnus foliorum (O.F.Mueller, 1764)
- Isochnus goniophallus (Anderson, 1989)
- Isochnus kamchaticus (Morimoto, 2000)
- Isochnus populi (A.Hustache, 1931)
- Isochnus saliceti (A.Hustache, 1931)
- Isochnus sequensi (Stierlin, 1894)
