= Synistovalgus luluensis =

Scientific classification
- Kingdom: Animalia
- Phylum: Arthropoda
- Clade: Pancrustacea
- Class: Insecta
- Order: Coleoptera
- Suborder: Polyphaga
- Infraorder: Scarabaeiformia
- Family: Scarabaeidae
- Genus: Synistovalgus
- Species: S. luluensis

Binomial name
- Synistovalgus luluensis (Burgeon, 1934)

Synonyms
- Stenovalgus luluensis Burgeon, 1934

Species of beetle

Synistovalgus luluensis is a species of beetle of the family Scarabaeidae. It is found in the Democratic Republic of the Congo.

== Description ==
Adults reach a length of about 3.2–3.7 mm (0.13–0.15 in). They are similar to Synistovalgus minutus, but may be distinguished by the deep, scaleless depression in the middle of the last sternite in males.
