= Synistovalgus rougeoti =

Scientific classification
- Kingdom: Animalia
- Phylum: Arthropoda
- Clade: Pancrustacea
- Class: Insecta
- Order: Coleoptera
- Suborder: Polyphaga
- Infraorder: Scarabaeiformia
- Family: Scarabaeidae
- Genus: Synistovalgus
- Species: S. rougeoti

Binomial name
- Synistovalgus rougeoti Antoine, 1997

Species of beetle

Synistovalgus rougeoti is a species of beetle of the family Scarabaeidae. It is found in the Democratic Republic of the Congo.

== Description ==
Adults reach a length of about 2.5–2.7 mm (0.098–0.106 in). They are very similar to Synistovalgus minutus, but are slightly smaller and the structure of the parameters is different.
