= Valgus seticollis =

Scientific classification
- Kingdom: Animalia
- Phylum: Arthropoda
- Clade: Pancrustacea
- Class: Insecta
- Order: Coleoptera
- Suborder: Polyphaga
- Infraorder: Scarabaeiformia
- Family: Scarabaeidae
- Genus: Valgus
- Species: V. seticollis

Binomial name
- Valgus seticollis (Palisot de Beauvois, 1805)

Synonyms
- Trichius seticollis Palisot de Beauvois, 1807; Valgus arabicus Nonfried, 1895; Trichius squamiger Palisot de Beauvois, 1805

Species of beetle

Valgus seticollis, the bristly-necked valgus, is a species of scarab beetle in the family Scarabaeidae. It is found in North America, where it has been recorded from Arkansas, Connecticut, Georgia, Illinois, Indiana, Iowa, Kansas, Kentucky, Maryland, Massachusetts, Mississippi, Missouri, Nebraska, New Jersey, New York, North Carolina, Ohio, Pennsylvania, Rhode Island, South Carolina, Tennessee, Texas, Virginia and West Virginia.

== Taxonomy ==
Valgus arabicus was described by Nonfried in 1895 from a specimen labelled El Sâna, Arabien (Yemen). It is unlikely that a Valgini species is present on the Arabian Peninsula, and the species has not been collected since its description. The specimen was possibly mislabelled or may have been transported with wood imported from the United States.
