= Synistovalgus bifasciatus =

Scientific classification
- Kingdom: Animalia
- Phylum: Arthropoda
- Clade: Pancrustacea
- Class: Insecta
- Order: Coleoptera
- Suborder: Polyphaga
- Infraorder: Scarabaeiformia
- Family: Scarabaeidae
- Genus: Synistovalgus
- Species: S. bifasciatus

Binomial name
- Synistovalgus bifasciatus Kraatz, 1897

Synonyms
- Stenovalgus bimaculatus Péringuey, 1907; Stenovalgus sebakuanus Péringuey, 1907; Stenovalgus quinquedentatus Kraatz, 1897

Species of beetle

Synistovalgus bifasciatus is a species of beetle of the family Scarabaeidae. It is found in Mozambique, Tanzania and Zimbabwe.

== Description ==
Adults reach a length of about 3.4–3.6 mm (0.13–0.14 in). They are similar to Synistovalgus minutus, but the posterior angles of the pronotum are very obtuse but marked, and there is a smooth depression in the middle of the last sternite in males. Furthermore, the parameres are different.
