= Synistovalgus convexicollis =

Scientific classification
- Kingdom: Animalia
- Phylum: Arthropoda
- Clade: Pancrustacea
- Class: Insecta
- Order: Coleoptera
- Suborder: Polyphaga
- Infraorder: Scarabaeiformia
- Family: Scarabaeidae
- Genus: Synistovalgus
- Species: S. convexicollis

Binomial name
- Synistovalgus convexicollis (Kraatz, 1895)

Synonyms
- Stenovalgus convexicollis Kraatz, 1895; Microvalgus reticulatus Arrow, 1944

Species of beetle

Synistovalgus convexicollis is a species of beetle of the family Scarabaeidae. It is found in Ivory Coast and Togo.

== Description ==
Adults reach a length of about 2.8–3 mm (0.11–0.12 in). They are similar to Synistovalgus minutus, but may be distinguished by the larger tomentose patch on the elytra, which gradually widens outwards and by the flat, granular area, bordered by a dense fringe of scales in the middle of the last sternite in males.
