= Charitovalgus scorpio =

Scientific classification
- Kingdom: Animalia
- Phylum: Arthropoda
- Clade: Pancrustacea
- Class: Insecta
- Order: Coleoptera
- Suborder: Polyphaga
- Infraorder: Scarabaeiformia
- Family: Scarabaeidae
- Genus: Charitovalgus
- Species: C. scorpio

Binomial name
- Charitovalgus scorpio Arrow, 1944

Species of beetle

Charitovalgus scorpio is a species of beetle of the family Scarabaeidae. It is found in Papua New Guinea.

== Description ==
Adults reach a length of about 4–5 mm (0.16–0.20 in). They are chocolate-brown, the upper surface clothed with black scales and irregularly distributed white scales. The underside is black with scattered pale scales.
