= Dasyvalgus trusmadii =

Scientific classification
- Kingdom: Animalia
- Phylum: Arthropoda
- Clade: Pancrustacea
- Class: Insecta
- Order: Coleoptera
- Suborder: Polyphaga
- Infraorder: Scarabaeiformia
- Family: Scarabaeidae
- Genus: Dasyvalgus
- Species: D. trusmadii

Binomial name
- Dasyvalgus trusmadii Ricchiardi, 2013

Species of beetle

Dasyvalgus trusmadii is a species of beetle of the family Scarabaeidae. It is found in Malaysia (Sabah).

== Description ==
Adults reach a length of about 5 mm (0.20 in). The body is mostly black dorsally, and the head is slightly shiny and covered with large, umbilicate puntures. The pronotum is glabrous, except for six small black scale tufts. The elytra are shiny and covered with scattered, testaceous scales.
