= Dasyvalgus ligthbrowni =

Scientific classification
- Kingdom: Animalia
- Phylum: Arthropoda
- Clade: Pancrustacea
- Class: Insecta
- Order: Coleoptera
- Suborder: Polyphaga
- Infraorder: Scarabaeiformia
- Family: Scarabaeidae
- Genus: Dasyvalgus
- Species: D. ligthbrowni

Binomial name
- Dasyvalgus ligthbrowni Ricchiardi, 2015

Species of beetle

Dasyvalgus ligthbrowni is a species of beetle of the family Scarabaeidae. It is found in China (Yunnan).

== Description ==
Adults reach a length of about 5.1 mm (0.20 in). They have a light brown body, with the head, scutellum and prosternum darkened.

== Etymology ==
The name of the species refers to its prevailing light brown colour.
