= Dasyvalgus varius =

Scientific classification
- Kingdom: Animalia
- Phylum: Arthropoda
- Clade: Pancrustacea
- Class: Insecta
- Order: Coleoptera
- Suborder: Polyphaga
- Infraorder: Scarabaeiformia
- Family: Scarabaeidae
- Genus: Dasyvalgus
- Species: D. varius

Binomial name
- Dasyvalgus varius Ricchiardi, 2015

Species of beetle

Dasyvalgus varius is a species of beetle of the family Scarabaeidae. It is found in China (Sichuan).

== Description ==
Adults reach a length of about 6.2 mm (0.24 in). They have a black, slightly shiny head, covered with large punctures and with scattered, testaceous scales forming two scale tufts on the frons. The pronotum is black, with scattered, testaceous scales and some black and testaceous scale tufts. The elytra are brown, shiny, and covered with black, yellow or testaceous small scales.
