= Dasyvalgus rufipes =

Scientific classification
- Kingdom: Animalia
- Phylum: Arthropoda
- Clade: Pancrustacea
- Class: Insecta
- Order: Coleoptera
- Suborder: Polyphaga
- Infraorder: Scarabaeiformia
- Family: Scarabaeidae
- Genus: Dasyvalgus
- Species: D. rufipes

Binomial name
- Dasyvalgus rufipes Ricchiardi, 2015

Species of beetle

Dasyvalgus rufipes is a species of beetle of the family Scarabaeidae. It is found in China (Guangxi, Hainan) and Laos.

== Description ==
Adults reach a length of about 6.5 mm (0.26 in). They have a black body, with the head slightly shiny, glabrous and covered with large, confluent punctures. The pronotum is black, glabrous and covered with large punctures and with four small, black scale tufts. The elytra are slightly shiny, mostly glabrous, laterally red and blackish in the centre. There are some black and testaceous scales.

== Etymology ==
The species is named after its red elytra.
