= Dasyvalgus hauseri =

Scientific classification
- Kingdom: Animalia
- Phylum: Arthropoda
- Clade: Pancrustacea
- Class: Insecta
- Order: Coleoptera
- Suborder: Polyphaga
- Infraorder: Scarabaeiformia
- Family: Scarabaeidae
- Genus: Dasyvalgus
- Species: D. hauseri

Binomial name
- Dasyvalgus hauseri Ricchiardi, 2013

Species of beetle

Dasyvalgus hauseri is a species of beetle of the family Scarabaeidae. It is found in Malaysia (Sabah) and Indonesia (Sumatra).

== Description ==
Adults reach a length of about 5.2 mm (0.20 in). The body is black and the head is shiny and covered with large punctures with testaceous setae. The pronotum has a partly testaceous, partly blackish scale tuft and four blackish tufts at the base. The elytra are slightly shiny and covered with small, blackish scales.

== Etymology ==
The species is dedicated to C. Hauser, who collected the holotype.
