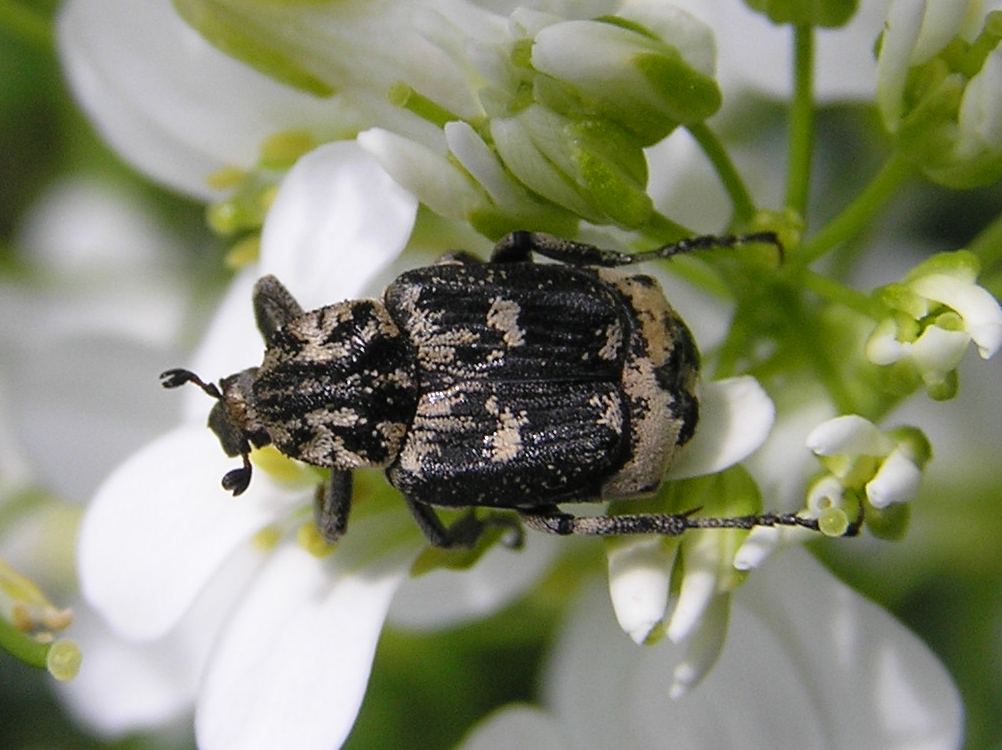
- male Valgus hemipterus

Scientific classification
- Kingdom: Animalia
- Phylum: Arthropoda
- Clade: Pancrustacea
- Class: Insecta
- Order: Coleoptera
- Suborder: Polyphaga
- Infraorder: Scarabaeiformia
- Family: Scarabaeidae
- Subfamily: Cetoniinae
- Tribe: Valgini; Mulsant, 1842

Genera
- Over 30 genera; see text

= Valgini =

Tribe of beetles

Valgini is a small tribe of scarab beetles, formerly considered a subfamily, Valginae. Most species occur in the Old World. They tend to be compact, and scaly or spiny.

== List of subtribes and genera ==
Subtribe Microvalgina Kolbe, 1904

- Ischnovalgus Kolbe, 1897
- Microvalgus Kraatz, 1883
- Synistovalgus Kolbe, 1897

Subtribe Valgina

- Acanthovalgus Kraatz, 1895
- Bivalgus Paulian, 1961
- Chaetovalgus Moser, 1914
- Charitovalgus Kolbe, 1904
- Chromovalgus Kolbe, 1897
- Comythovalgus Kolbe, 1897
- Cosmovalgus Kolbe, 1897
- Dasyvalgoides Endrödi, 1952
- Dasyvalgus Kolbe, 1904
- Euryvalgus Moser, 1908
- Excisivalgus Endrödi, 1952
- Heterovalgus Krikken, 1978
- Homovalgus Kolbe, 1897
- Hoplitovalgus Kolbe, 1904
- Hybovalgus Kolbe, 1904
- Idiovalgus Arrow, 1910
- Indovalgus Ricchiardi, 2012
- Lepivalgus Moser, 1914
- Lobovalgus Kolbe, 1897
- Mimovalgus Arrow, 1944
- Neovalgus Miyake, 1985
- Nipponovalgus Sawada, 1941
- Oedipovalgus Kolbe, 1897
- Oreoderus Burmeister, 1842
- Oreovalgus Kolbe, 1904
- Podovalgus Arrow, 1910
- Pygovalgus Kolbe, 1884
- Sphinctovalgus Kolbe, 1904
- Tarsovalgus Miyake, 1993
- Tibiovalgus Kolbe, 1904
- Valgoides Fairmaire, 1899
- Valgus Scriba, 1790
- Xenoreoderus Arrow, 1910
- Yanovalgus Nomura, 1952
