= Charitovalgus vermeulenae =

Scientific classification
- Kingdom: Animalia
- Phylum: Arthropoda
- Clade: Pancrustacea
- Class: Insecta
- Order: Coleoptera
- Suborder: Polyphaga
- Infraorder: Scarabaeiformia
- Family: Scarabaeidae
- Genus: Charitovalgus
- Species: C. vermeulenae

Binomial name
- Charitovalgus vermeulenae Krikken, 1987

Species of beetle

Charitovalgus vermeulenae is a species of beetle of the family Scarabaeidae. It is found in Indonesia (Sulawesi).

== Description ==
Adults reach a length of about 6 mm (0.24 in). They are reddish with the scales white, yellow, brown and black (with the black and white predominant).
