= Dasyvalgus javus =

Scientific classification
- Kingdom: Animalia
- Phylum: Arthropoda
- Clade: Pancrustacea
- Class: Insecta
- Order: Coleoptera
- Suborder: Polyphaga
- Infraorder: Scarabaeiformia
- Family: Scarabaeidae
- Genus: Dasyvalgus
- Species: D. javus

Binomial name
- Dasyvalgus javus Ricchiardi, 2013

Species of beetle

Dasyvalgus javus is a species of beetle of the family Scarabaeidae. It is found in Indonesia (Java).

== Description ==
Adults reach a length of about 6.2 mm (0.24 in). The body is black and the head is dull and covered with small, circular punctures. The pronotum has a tuft of testaceous scales and four testaceous scale tufts at the base. The elytra are slightly shiny and covered with small, testaceous scales not forming a pattern.
