= Oreovalgus =

Scientific classification
- Kingdom: Animalia
- Phylum: Arthropoda
- Clade: Pancrustacea
- Class: Insecta
- Order: Coleoptera
- Suborder: Polyphaga
- Infraorder: Scarabaeiformia
- Family: Scarabaeidae
- Subfamily: Cetoniinae
- Tribe: Valgini
- Genus: Oreovalgus; Kolbe, 1904

Genus of leaf beetles

Oreovalgus is a genus of beetles belonging to the family Scarabaeidae.

== Species ==
- Oreovalgus bryanti Arrow, 1944
- Oreovalgus cristatus (Gestro, 1891)
- Oreovalgus merkli Ricchiardi, 1995
- Oreovalgus sandakanus Moser, 1921
