= Ischnovalgus =

Scientific classification
- Kingdom: Animalia
- Phylum: Arthropoda
- Clade: Pancrustacea
- Class: Insecta
- Order: Coleoptera
- Suborder: Polyphaga
- Infraorder: Scarabaeiformia
- Family: Scarabaeidae
- Subfamily: Cetoniinae
- Tribe: Valgini
- Genus: Ischnovalgus; Kolbe, 1897

Genus of leaf beetles

Ischnovalgus is a genus of beetles belonging to the family Scarabaeidae.

== Species ==
- Ischnovalgus albosquamosus (Fairmaire, 1887)
- Ischnovalgus collinus Kolbe, 1897
- Ischnovalgus concentricalis Kolbe, 1897
- Ischnovalgus gracilis Kolbe, 1897
- Ischnovalgus kolbei Ruter, 1969
- Ischnovalgus sulcicollis Moser, 1921
