= Comythovalgus modestus =

Scientific classification
- Kingdom: Animalia
- Phylum: Arthropoda
- Clade: Pancrustacea
- Class: Insecta
- Order: Coleoptera
- Suborder: Polyphaga
- Infraorder: Scarabaeiformia
- Family: Scarabaeidae
- Genus: Comythovalgus
- Species: C. modestus

Binomial name
- Comythovalgus modestus Schein, 1956

Species of beetle

Comythovalgus modestus is a species of beetle of the family Scarabaeidae. It is found in Kenya.

== Description ==
Adults reach a length of about 4–5 mm (0.16–0.20 in). The ground colour is pitch black, with the scales on the upper and underside brown, but in places on the propygidium and pygidium a tone lighter. The scales are generally dense, but not cover the ground colour in some places.
