= Dasyvalgus sauteri =

Scientific classification
- Kingdom: Animalia
- Phylum: Arthropoda
- Clade: Pancrustacea
- Class: Insecta
- Order: Coleoptera
- Suborder: Polyphaga
- Infraorder: Scarabaeiformia
- Family: Scarabaeidae
- Genus: Dasyvalgus
- Species: D. sauteri

Binomial name
- Dasyvalgus sauteri Ricchiardi, 1998

Species of beetle

Dasyvalgus sauteri is a species of beetle of the family Scarabaeidae. It is found in Taiwan.

== Description ==
Adults reach a length of about 5.6 mm (0.22 in). They are brown, with the head covered by small, ochraceous scales. The pronotum is covered by scattered, oval, ochraceous scales and also has six ochraceous scale tufts. The elytra are covered by ochraceous scales and there is a small black scale-spot on the disk.

== Etymology ==
The species is dedicated to Mr H. Sauter, who collected the species.
