= Dasyvalgus minutus =

Scientific classification
- Kingdom: Animalia
- Phylum: Arthropoda
- Clade: Pancrustacea
- Class: Insecta
- Order: Coleoptera
- Suborder: Polyphaga
- Infraorder: Scarabaeiformia
- Family: Scarabaeidae
- Genus: Dasyvalgus
- Species: D. minutus

Binomial name
- Dasyvalgus minutus Ricchiardi, 2015

Species of beetle

Dasyvalgus minutus is a species of beetle of the family Scarabaeidae. It is found in China (Xizang).

== Description ==
Adults reach a length of about 4.5 mm (0.18 in). They have a black body, with the head slightly shiny and covered with large punctures. The elytra are slightly shiny and mostly glabrous, with a small scale tuft consisting of black scales.

== Etymology ==
The name of the species refers to its small size.
