= Valgus tonkinensis =

Scientific classification
- Kingdom: Animalia
- Phylum: Arthropoda
- Clade: Pancrustacea
- Class: Insecta
- Order: Coleoptera
- Suborder: Polyphaga
- Infraorder: Scarabaeiformia
- Family: Scarabaeidae
- Genus: Valgus
- Species: V. tonkinensis

Binomial name
- Valgus tonkinensis Arrow, 1944

Species of beetle

Valgus tonkinensis is a species of beetle of the family Scarabaeidae. It is found in Vietnam.

== Description ==
Adults reach a length of about 8 mm (0.31 in). They are black, with buff-coloured scales and a short transverse bar before the middle of each elytron.
