= Dasyvalgus schulzei =

Scientific classification
- Kingdom: Animalia
- Phylum: Arthropoda
- Clade: Pancrustacea
- Class: Insecta
- Order: Coleoptera
- Suborder: Polyphaga
- Infraorder: Scarabaeiformia
- Family: Scarabaeidae
- Genus: Dasyvalgus
- Species: D. schulzei

Binomial name
- Dasyvalgus schulzei Ricchiardi, 1998

Species of beetle

Dasyvalgus schulzei is a species of beetle of the family Scarabaeidae. It is found in India (Tamil Nadu).

== Description ==
Adults reach a length of about 4.4–4.7 mm (0.17–0.19 in). They are brown, with the posterior part of the head black. The pronotum is covered by scattered, long, ochraceous scales and there are four black scale tufts at the base. The elytra are covered by ochraceous or black long scales that form a confused pattern. There is also a black spot on the disk.

== Etymology ==
The species is dedicated to Mr Joachim Schulz.
