= Charitovalgus bufo =

Scientific classification
- Kingdom: Animalia
- Phylum: Arthropoda
- Clade: Pancrustacea
- Class: Insecta
- Order: Coleoptera
- Suborder: Polyphaga
- Infraorder: Scarabaeiformia
- Family: Scarabaeidae
- Genus: Charitovalgus
- Species: C. bufo

Binomial name
- Charitovalgus bufo Arrow, 1944

Species of beetle

Charitovalgus bufo is a species of beetle of the family Scarabaeidae. It is found in Laos and Thailand.

== Description ==
Adults reach a length of about 7 mm (0.28 in). They are black, with the scutellum and adjacent part of the elytra brown. The underside is clothed with short white scales. The head, most of the pronotum and a transverse bar on the elytra have similar white scales.
