= Charitovalgus =

Scientific classification
- Kingdom: Animalia
- Phylum: Arthropoda
- Clade: Pancrustacea
- Class: Insecta
- Order: Coleoptera
- Suborder: Polyphaga
- Infraorder: Scarabaeiformia
- Family: Scarabaeidae
- Subfamily: Cetoniinae
- Tribe: Valgini
- Genus: Charitovalgus; Kolbe, 1904

Genus of leaf beetles

Charitovalgus is a genus of beetles belonging to the family Scarabaeidae.

== Species ==
- Charitovalgus andamanicus Kolbe, 1904
- Charitovalgus bufo Arrow, 1944
- Charitovalgus croesus Arrow, 1944
- Charitovalgus doriae (Gestro, 1891)
- Charitovalgus formosanus Sawada, 1939
- Charitovalgus keysseri (Hauser, 1904)
- Charitovalgus longulus (Gestro, 1891)
- Charitovalgus pulcher (Kraatz, 1883)
- Charitovalgus scorpio Arrow, 1944
- Charitovalgus vermeulenae Krikken, 1987
