= Dasyvalgus rugosus =

Scientific classification
- Kingdom: Animalia
- Phylum: Arthropoda
- Clade: Pancrustacea
- Class: Insecta
- Order: Coleoptera
- Suborder: Polyphaga
- Infraorder: Scarabaeiformia
- Family: Scarabaeidae
- Genus: Dasyvalgus
- Species: D. rugosus

Binomial name
- Dasyvalgus rugosus Ricchiardi, 2013

Species of beetle

Dasyvalgus rugosus is a species of beetle of the family Scarabaeidae. It is found in China (Yunnan).

== Description ==
Adults reach a length of about 5.4 mm (0.21 in). The body is black, and the head is slightly shiny and covered with large, confluent puntures. The pronotum has two black scale tufts. The elytra are slightly shiny and mostly glabrous, except for the anterior border, which is covered with a band of dark testaceous scales. The center of the disc has a spot of small black scales, surrounded by whitish scales. The surface is covered with testaceous, small scales.
