= Microvalgus =

Scientific classification
- Kingdom: Animalia
- Phylum: Arthropoda
- Clade: Pancrustacea
- Class: Insecta
- Order: Coleoptera
- Suborder: Polyphaga
- Infraorder: Scarabaeiformia
- Family: Scarabaeidae
- Subfamily: Cetoniinae
- Tribe: Valgini
- Genus: Microvalgus; Kraatz, 1883

Synonyms
- Stenovalgus Kolbe, 1892; Paidiovalgus Kolbe, 1904

Genus of leaf beetles

Microvalgus is a genus of beetles belonging to the family Scarabaeidae.

== Species ==
- subgenus Microvalgus
  - Microvalgus apicalis Lea, 1914
  - Microvalgus ater (Nonfried, 1895)
  - Microvalgus bursariae Lea, 1914
  - Microvalgus carinulatus (Kolbe, 1892)
  - Microvalgus castaneipennis (MacLeay, 1871)
  - Microvalgus dubius Lea, 1914
  - Microvalgus elongatus (Bourgoin, 1921)
  - Microvalgus fasciculatus Lea, 1914
  - Microvalgus flavipennis Arrow, 1944
  - Microvalgus gabonensis Antoine, 1997
  - Microvalgus glaber Lea, 1914
  - Microvalgus gracilis (Kraatz, 1895)
  - Microvalgus kivuensis (Burgeon, 1934)
  - Microvalgus lapeyrousei (Gory & Percheron, 1833)
  - Microvalgus lateralis (Moser, 1916)
  - Microvalgus mucronatus Lea, 1914
  - Microvalgus nigriceps Lea, 1914
  - Microvalgus nigrinus (MacLeay, 1871)
  - Microvalgus nitidus (Bourgoin, 1921)
  - Microvalgus parallelicollis (Bourgoin, 1921)
  - Microvalgus quinquedentatus Lea, 1914
  - Microvalgus rufipennis Lea, 1914
  - Microvalgus schoutedeni (Moser, 1916)
  - Microvalgus scutellaris Blackburn, 1894
  - Microvalgus squamipes (Bourgoin, 1921)
  - Microvalgus squamiventris Lea, 1914
  - Microvalgus sulphureus (Bourgoin, 1921)
  - Microvalgus termiticola (Burgeon, 1946)
  - Microvalgus turei Antoine, 1997
  - Microvalgus unicarinatus (Moser, 1913)
  - Microvalgus vagans Lea, 1914
  - Microvalgus yilgarnensis Blackburn, 1892

subgenus:Paediovalgus Kolbe, 1904

  - Microvalgus bicolor (Pic, 1928)
  - Microvalgus bruneiensis Antoine, 1993
  - Microvalgus curtus (Paulian, 1961)
  - Microvalgus duponti Antoine, 1993
  - Microvalgus emarginatus Antoine, 1993
  - Microvalgus excavatus Antoine, 1993
  - Microvalgus idjenensis Antoine, 1993
  - Microvalgus iners Prokofiev, 2015
  - Microvalgus javanicus Antoine, 1993
  - Microvalgus laoticus Antoine, 1993
  - Microvalgus luzonensis Antoine, 1993
  - Microvalgus micros (Kolbe, 1904)
  - Microvalgus mindanaoensis Antoine, 1993
  - Microvalgus modiglianii Antoine, 1993
  - Microvalgus nagaii Antoine, 1993
  - Microvalgus pachyphallus Antoine, 1993
  - Microvalgus parcus (Kolbe, 1904)
  - Microvalgus pilosus Antoine, 1999
  - Microvalgus subemarginatus Antoine, 1993
  - Microvalgus sumatrensis Antoine, 1993
