= Synistovalgus =

Scientific classification
- Kingdom: Animalia
- Phylum: Arthropoda
- Clade: Pancrustacea
- Class: Insecta
- Order: Coleoptera
- Suborder: Polyphaga
- Infraorder: Scarabaeiformia
- Family: Scarabaeidae
- Subfamily: Cetoniinae
- Tribe: Valgini
- Genus: Synistovalgus; Kolbe, 1897

Genus of leaf beetles

Synistovalgus is a genus of beetles belonging to the family Scarabaeidae.

== Species ==
- Synistovalgus bifasciatus Kraatz, 1897
- Synistovalgus convexicollis (Kraatz, 1895)
- Synistovalgus luluensis (Burgeon, 1934)
- Synistovalgus minutus Kolbe, 1897
- Synistovalgus rougeoti Antoine, 1997
