= Heterovalgus alberti =

Scientific classification
- Kingdom: Animalia
- Phylum: Arthropoda
- Clade: Pancrustacea
- Class: Insecta
- Order: Coleoptera
- Suborder: Polyphaga
- Infraorder: Scarabaeiformia
- Family: Scarabaeidae
- Genus: Heterovalgus
- Species: H. alberti

Binomial name
- Heterovalgus alberti Ricchiardi, 1992

Species of beetle

Heterovalgus alberti is a species of beetle of the family Scarabaeidae. It is found in Malaysia (Sarawak) and Thailand.

== Description ==
Adults reach a length of about 5.6–5.8 mm (0.22–0.23 in). They are black, shining and completely glabrous, with an orange abdomen and propygidium. The pronotum and elytra do not have any scale tufts.

== Etymology ==
The species is dedicated Alberto, the son of the author.
