= Dasyvalgus =

Scientific classification
- Kingdom: Animalia
- Phylum: Arthropoda
- Clade: Pancrustacea
- Class: Insecta
- Order: Coleoptera
- Suborder: Polyphaga
- Infraorder: Scarabaeiformia
- Family: Scarabaeidae
- Subfamily: Cetoniinae
- Tribe: Valgini
- Genus: Dasyvalgus; Kolbe, 1904

Synonyms
- Anepsiovalgus Kolbe, 1904; Dasyvalgus (Trichovalgus) Kolbe, 1904; Nannovalgus Kolbe, 1904; Plocovalgus Kolbe, 1904; Syngonovalgus Kolbe, 1904; Spilovalgus Kolbe, 1904

Genus of leaf beetles

Dasyvalgus is a genus of beetles belonging to the family Scarabaeidae.

== Species ==
- subgenus Dasyvalgus
  - Dasyvalgus addendus (Walker, 1859)
  - Dasyvalgus annamensis Miyake, 1993
  - Dasyvalgus beccarii (Gestro, 1891)
  - Dasyvalgus becvariensis Ricchiardi, 2015
  - Dasyvalgus benesi Ricchiardi, 2015
  - Dasyvalgus binhanus (Pic, 1928)
  - Dasyvalgus biplagiatus Moser, 1915
  - Dasyvalgus bipustulatus Moser, 1904
  - Dasyvalgus bonifacyi Paulian, 1961
  - Dasyvalgus cambodjensis Paulian, 1961
  - Dasyvalgus carbonarius Arrow, 1910
  - Dasyvalgus castaneodorsalis Miyake, 1993
  - Dasyvalgus coriaceus Arrow, 1944
  - Dasyvalgus cruciatus Moser, 1908
  - Dasyvalgus dalatinus Miyake, 1993
  - Dasyvalgus decamaculatus Miyake, 1993
  - Dasyvalgus dohrni Kolbe, 1904
  - Dasyvalgus eucharis Kolbe, 1904
  - Dasyvalgus flavicauda Miyake, Yamaguchi & Aoki, 2002
  - Dasyvalgus flavomaculatus Miyake & Yamaya, 1993
  - Dasyvalgus formosanus Moser, 1915
  - Dasyvalgus fraterculus Moser, 1904
  - Dasyvalgus frenzeli Ricchiardi, 2013
  - Dasyvalgus fulvicauda Arrow, 1910
  - Dasyvalgus gilleti Moser, 1906
  - Dasyvalgus grandis Pic, 1928
  - Dasyvalgus hauseri Ricchiardi, 2013
  - Dasyvalgus hystrix Arrow, 1910
  - Dasyvalgus ichangicus Moser, 1915
  - Dasyvalgus infuscatus Kolbe, 1904
  - Dasyvalgus inouei Sawada, 1939
  - Dasyvalgus insularis Arrow, 1910
  - Dasyvalgus javus Ricchiardi, 2013
  - Dasyvalgus kanarensis Arrow, 1910
  - Dasyvalgus laligantii (Fairmaire, 1888)
  - Dasyvalgus ligthbrowni Ricchiardi, 2015
  - Dasyvalgus luctuosus (Gestro, 1891)
  - Dasyvalgus luteofasciatus Paulian, 1961
  - Dasyvalgus luzonicus (Kraatz, 1883)
  - Dasyvalgus macacus Miyake, 1993
  - Dasyvalgus makiharai Miyake, 1985
  - Dasyvalgus malayensis Ricchiardi, 2013
  - Dasyvalgus mexicanus (Cazier, 1937)
  - Dasyvalgus militaris Arrow, 1910
  - Dasyvalgus mimus (Kolbe, 1904)
  - Dasyvalgus minahasanus Miyake, 1989
  - Dasyvalgus mindanaonensis Ricchiardi, 1996
  - Dasyvalgus minimus Arrow, 1910
  - Dasyvalgus minutus Ricchiardi, 2015
  - Dasyvalgus miyakei Ricchiardi, 1995
  - Dasyvalgus monachus Kolbe, 1904
  - Dasyvalgus montivagus Moser, 1915
  - Dasyvalgus motuoensis Ricchiardi, 2015
  - Dasyvalgus multicus Miyake, 1993
  - Dasyvalgus nagaii Ricchiardi, 1995
  - Dasyvalgus niger (Kraatz, 1883)
  - Dasyvalgus nigerrimus Moser, 1904
  - Dasyvalgus nigritus Moser, 1914
  - Dasyvalgus nigrofasciculatus Moser, 1906
  - Dasyvalgus nigromaculatus Moser, 1908
  - Dasyvalgus nudis Miyake, 1994
  - Dasyvalgus obscurus Moser, 1921
  - Dasyvalgus obsoletus Moser, 1917
  - Dasyvalgus occidentalis (Arrow, 1910)
  - Dasyvalgus ochii Miyake, 1989
  - Dasyvalgus ovicollis Arrow, 1910
  - Dasyvalgus palawanus Ricchiardi, 1996
  - Dasyvalgus panaonus Moser, 1916
  - Dasyvalgus paratomentatus Ricchiardi, 2015
  - Dasyvalgus penicillatus (Blanchard, 1850)
  - Dasyvalgus philippinus Ricchiardi, 1996
  - Dasyvalgus piceus Moser, 1904
  - Dasyvalgus plebejus Moser, 1908
  - Dasyvalgus poilaneorum Paulian, 1961
  - Dasyvalgus proximus Ricchiardi, 1994
  - Dasyvalgus pulchellus Moser, 1915
  - Dasyvalgus pusillus Ricchiardi, 2013
  - Dasyvalgus pusio (Kolbe, 1904)
  - Dasyvalgus pygidialis Moser, 1904
  - Dasyvalgus pyrrhopygus (Kraatz, 1883)
  - Dasyvalgus quadripustulatus Moser, 1908
  - Dasyvalgus rollei Kolbe, 1904
  - Dasyvalgus rubrothoracicus Miyake, 1993
  - Dasyvalgus ruficauda Arrow, 1944
  - Dasyvalgus rufipennis Arrow, 1944
  - Dasyvalgus rufipes Ricchiardi, 2015
  - Dasyvalgus rugosus Ricchiardi, 2013
  - Dasyvalgus sabahi Ricchiardi, 2013
  - Dasyvalgus sabatinellii Ricchiardi, 1994
  - Dasyvalgus samariensis Ricchiardi, 1996
  - Dasyvalgus sarawakensis Moser, 1911
  - Dasyvalgus sauteri Ricchiardi, 1998
  - Dasyvalgus schulzei Ricchiardi, 1998
  - Dasyvalgus sellatus (Kraatz, 1883)
  - Dasyvalgus seriesquamosus Moser, 1908
  - Dasyvalgus setipygus Moser, 1917
  - Dasyvalgus shimomurai Kobayashi, 1994
  - Dasyvalgus similis Moser, 1908
  - Dasyvalgus sommershofi Endrödi, 1952
  - Dasyvalgus spineus Miyake & Yamaya, 1993
  - Dasyvalgus stictopygus (Gestro, 1891)
  - Dasyvalgus striatipennis Moser, 1904
  - Dasyvalgus subglaber Paulian, 1961
  - Dasyvalgus submontanus Ricchiardi, 1994
  - Dasyvalgus subnitidus (Kolbe, 1904)
  - Dasyvalgus taiwanus Miyake, 1991
  - Dasyvalgus taoi Miyake, 1989
  - Dasyvalgus tessellatus Arrow, 1944
  - Dasyvalgus testaceus (Kraatz, 1896)
  - Dasyvalgus tigrinus Moser, 1906
  - Dasyvalgus tomentatus Ricchiardi, 2015
  - Dasyvalgus trisinuatus (Gestro, 1891)
  - Dasyvalgus tristis (Gestro, 1891)
  - Dasyvalgus trusmadii Ricchiardi, 2013
  - Dasyvalgus tuberculatus (Lewis, 1887)
  - Dasyvalgus udei Kolbe, 1904
  - Dasyvalgus variegatus Moser, 1915
  - Dasyvalgus varius Ricchiardi, 2015
  - Dasyvalgus vethi (Ritsema, 1879)
  - Dasyvalgus viduatus Arrow, 1910
  - Dasyvalgus wadai Miyake, 1985
  - Dasyvalgus waterstradti (Kolbe, 1904)
  - Dasyvalgus xanthurus Paulian, 1961
  - Dasyvalgus yoshikazui Ricchiardi, 2013
- subgenus Spilovalgus Kolbe, 1904
  - Dasyvalgus biguttatus (Moser, 1904)
  - Dasyvalgus bimaculatus (Kraatz, 1896)
  - Dasyvalgus inarcuatus Ricchiardi, 1995
  - Dasyvalgus modiglianii (Gestro, 1889)
