= Charitovalgus croesus =

Scientific classification
- Kingdom: Animalia
- Phylum: Arthropoda
- Clade: Pancrustacea
- Class: Insecta
- Order: Coleoptera
- Suborder: Polyphaga
- Infraorder: Scarabaeiformia
- Family: Scarabaeidae
- Genus: Charitovalgus
- Species: C. croesus

Binomial name
- Charitovalgus croesus Arrow, 1944

Species of beetle

Charitovalgus croesus is a species of beetle of the family Scarabaeidae. It is found in Laos.

== Description ==
Adults reach a length of about 7 mm (0.28 in). They are black, with the scutellum and a triangular basal area on the elytra extending to about the middle, densely covered with bright yellow scales. There are some white scales on each side of the apex of the yellow triangle and a few more forming a small white spot close to the hind margin of each elytron.
