= Oreovalgus bryanti =

Scientific classification
- Kingdom: Animalia
- Phylum: Arthropoda
- Clade: Pancrustacea
- Class: Insecta
- Order: Coleoptera
- Suborder: Polyphaga
- Infraorder: Scarabaeiformia
- Family: Scarabaeidae
- Genus: Oreovalgus
- Species: O. bryanti

Binomial name
- Oreovalgus bryanti Arrow, 1944

Species of beetle

Oreovalgus bryanti is a species of beetle of the family Scarabaeidae. It is found in Malaysia (Sarawak).

== Description ==
Adults reach a length of about 5.5 mm (0.22 in). They are black or dark brown, clothed with pale yellow or buff-coloured scales, which are rather close upon the lower surface and legs and upon parts of the pronotum.
