= Dasyvalgus malayensis =

Scientific classification
- Kingdom: Animalia
- Phylum: Arthropoda
- Clade: Pancrustacea
- Class: Insecta
- Order: Coleoptera
- Suborder: Polyphaga
- Infraorder: Scarabaeiformia
- Family: Scarabaeidae
- Genus: Dasyvalgus
- Species: D. malayensis

Binomial name
- Dasyvalgus malayensis Ricchiardi, 2013

Species of beetle

Dasyvalgus malayensis is a species of beetle of the family Scarabaeidae. It is found in Malaysia (Malaysian Peninsula).

== Description ==
Adults reach a length of about 7.8 mm (0.31 in). The body is dark brown and the head is slightly shiny and covered with large, circular punctures. The pronotum has black scale tufts and four blackish tufts at the base, and the surface is covered with dense, small brown scales. The elytra are slightly shiny and covered with small, rounded, black, brown or testaceous scales. There is a rounded black area at center of the disk.
