= Heterovalgus antoinei =

Scientific classification
- Kingdom: Animalia
- Phylum: Arthropoda
- Clade: Pancrustacea
- Class: Insecta
- Order: Coleoptera
- Suborder: Polyphaga
- Infraorder: Scarabaeiformia
- Family: Scarabaeidae
- Genus: Heterovalgus
- Species: H. antoinei

Binomial name
- Heterovalgus antoinei Ricchiardi, 1992

Species of beetle

Heterovalgus antoinei is a species of beetle of the family Scarabaeidae. It is found in Malaysia (Sabah, Malay Peninsula).

== Description ==
Adults reach a length of about 6.3 mm (0.25 in). They are black, with the pronotum is mostly orange, with a blackish area and no scale tufts. The elytra are black with a large orange spot and a spot of yellowish scales.

== Etymology ==
The species is dedicated to the entomologist Dr. Philippe Antoine.
