= Dasyvalgus paratomentatus =

Scientific classification
- Kingdom: Animalia
- Phylum: Arthropoda
- Clade: Pancrustacea
- Class: Insecta
- Order: Coleoptera
- Suborder: Polyphaga
- Infraorder: Scarabaeiformia
- Family: Scarabaeidae
- Genus: Dasyvalgus
- Species: D. paratomentatus

Binomial name
- Dasyvalgus paratomentatus Ricchiardi, 2015

Species of beetle

Dasyvalgus paratomentatus is a species of beetle of the family Scarabaeidae. It is found in China (Yunnan).

== Description ==
Adults reach a length of about 6.3 mm (0.25 in). They have a brown body, while the head is black, slightly shiny and covered with large punctures and scattered, testaceous scales forming three scale tufts on the frons. The pronotum is black or brown in some places and covered with testaceous scales in some places, as well as with testaceous/black scaled tufts. The elytra are slightly shiny, mostly glabrous, brown or black and covered with black or testaceous scales.
