= Comythovalgus =

Scientific classification
- Kingdom: Animalia
- Phylum: Arthropoda
- Clade: Pancrustacea
- Class: Insecta
- Order: Coleoptera
- Suborder: Polyphaga
- Infraorder: Scarabaeiformia
- Family: Scarabaeidae
- Subfamily: Cetoniinae
- Tribe: Valgini
- Genus: Comythovalgus; Kolbe, 1884

Genus of leaf beetles

Comythovalgus is a genus of beetles belonging to the family Scarabaeidae.

== Species ==
- Comythovalgus aemulus Kolbe, 1897
- Comythovalgus fasciculatus (Gyllenhal, 1817)
- Comythovalgus gallanus Müller, 1939
- Comythovalgus gedyei Schein, 1956
- Comythovalgus kenyensis Schein, 1956
- Comythovalgus kilimanus Kolbe, 1910
- Comythovalgus luvungiensis Burgeon, 1935
- Comythovalgus modestus Schein, 1956
- Comythovalgus plumatus (Fåhraeus, 1857)
- Comythovalgus pustulipennis (Kraatz, 1883)
- Comythovalgus sansibaricus Kolbe, 1896
- Comythovalgus unicolor Kolbe, 1897
- Comythovalgus villosus Kolbe, 1884
