= Dasyvalgus pusillus =

Scientific classification
- Kingdom: Animalia
- Phylum: Arthropoda
- Clade: Pancrustacea
- Class: Insecta
- Order: Coleoptera
- Suborder: Polyphaga
- Infraorder: Scarabaeiformia
- Family: Scarabaeidae
- Genus: Dasyvalgus
- Species: D. pusillus

Binomial name
- Dasyvalgus pusillus Ricchiardi, 2013

Synonyms
- Dasyvalgus pusillum

Species of beetle

Dasyvalgus pusillus is a species of beetle of the family Scarabaeidae. It is found in Malaysia (Sabah).

== Description ==
Adults reach a length of about 2.5 mm (0.098 in). The body is dark brown and the head is shiny and covered with large, umbilicate punctures and sometimes also with testaceous bristles-like scales. The pronotum is covered with scattered scales. There are four small basal scale tufts. The elytra are shiny and covered with testaceous scales.
