= Comythovalgus kenyensis =

Scientific classification
- Kingdom: Animalia
- Phylum: Arthropoda
- Clade: Pancrustacea
- Class: Insecta
- Order: Coleoptera
- Suborder: Polyphaga
- Infraorder: Scarabaeiformia
- Family: Scarabaeidae
- Genus: Comythovalgus
- Species: C. kenyensis

Binomial name
- Comythovalgus kenyensis Schein, 1956

Species of beetle

Comythovalgus kenyensis is a species of beetle of the family Scarabaeidae. It is found in Kenya.

== Description ==
Adults reach a length of about 5.5 mm (0.22 in). They are similar to Comythovalgus kilimanus, but may be distinguished by the brown legs and darker coloured females.
