= Dasyvalgus tomentatus =

Scientific classification
- Kingdom: Animalia
- Phylum: Arthropoda
- Clade: Pancrustacea
- Class: Insecta
- Order: Coleoptera
- Suborder: Polyphaga
- Infraorder: Scarabaeiformia
- Family: Scarabaeidae
- Genus: Dasyvalgus
- Species: D. tomentatus

Binomial name
- Dasyvalgus tomentatus Ricchiardi, 2015

Species of beetle

Dasyvalgus tomentatus is a species of beetle of the family Scarabaeidae. It is found in China (Sichuan, Yunnan).

== Description ==
Adults reach a length of about 5.5–6.5 mm (0.22–0.26 in). They have a black body, with the head slightly shiny and covered with large punctures and scattered, testaceous scales forming three scale tufts on the frons. The pronotum is black and covered with testaceous scales and with black and testaceous scale tufts. The elytra are shiny, brown or black in some places and covered with black or testaceous small scales, as well as with black scale tufts.
