= Heterovalgus poggii =

Scientific classification
- Kingdom: Animalia
- Phylum: Arthropoda
- Clade: Pancrustacea
- Class: Insecta
- Order: Coleoptera
- Suborder: Polyphaga
- Infraorder: Scarabaeiformia
- Family: Scarabaeidae
- Genus: Heterovalgus
- Species: H. poggii

Binomial name
- Heterovalgus poggii Ricchiardi, 1992

Species of beetle

Heterovalgus poggii is a species of beetle of the family Scarabaeidae. It is found in Indonesia (Sumatra).

== Description ==
Adults reach a length of about 5.3 mm (0.21 in). They are black, with a few scattered yellowish or whitish scales on the pygidium and head. The pronotum has no scale tufts and the elytra have seven striae.

== Etymology ==
The species is dedicated to Dr. Roberto Poggi.
