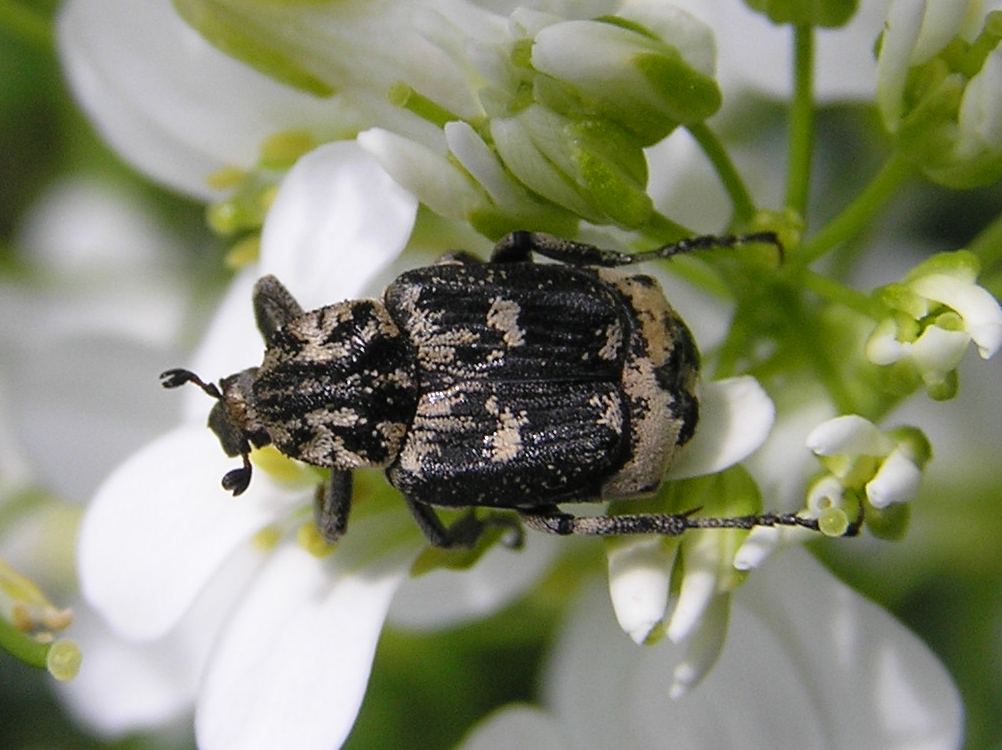
- Male V. hemipterus

Scientific classification
- Kingdom: Animalia
- Phylum: Arthropoda
- Clade: Pancrustacea
- Class: Insecta
- Order: Coleoptera
- Suborder: Polyphaga
- Infraorder: Scarabaeiformia
- Family: Scarabaeidae
- Subfamily: Cetoniinae
- Tribe: Valgini
- Genus: Valgus; Scriba, 1790

Species
- See text

= Valgus (beetle) =

Genus of beetles

Valgus is a genus of beetles. Most described species are found in Asia, with some reaching into northern Africa and Europe, and three species native to the New World. One species is found in South Africa.

== Species ==
- Valgus albomaculatus Kraatz, 1896 — Borneo
- Valgus californicus Horn, 1870 — Mexico, California
- Valgus canaliculatus (Olivier, 1789) — United States
- Valgus cristatus Gestro, 1891 — Borneo
- Valgus distinctus Nonfried, 1895 — Borneo
- Valgus fuscatus Kraatz, 1896 — Borneo
- Valgus hemipterus (Linnaeus, 1758) — Europe, Caucasus, Northern Africa, introduced to North America: Ontario, Michigan, Ohio
- Valgus koreanus Sawada, 1944 — Korea
- Valgus okajimai Kobayashi, 1994 — Taiwan
- Valgus parvicollis Fairmaire, 1891 — China
- Valgus parvulus Burmeister & Schaum, 1840 — Thailand
- Valgus quadrimaculatus Kraatz, 1883 — Malaysia
- Valgus savioi Pic, 1928 — China
- Valgus seticollis (Palisot de Beauvois, 1805) — USA
- Valgus smithii Macleay, 1838 — South Africa
- Valgus sumatranus Gestro, 1891 — Sumatra
- Valgus thibetanus Nonfried, 1891 — Tibet
- Valgus tonkinensis Arrow, 1944 — North Vietnam

== Selected former species ==
- Valgus arabicus Nonfried, 1895 — Arabia
