= Dasyvalgus becvariensis =

Scientific classification
- Kingdom: Animalia
- Phylum: Arthropoda
- Clade: Pancrustacea
- Class: Insecta
- Order: Coleoptera
- Suborder: Polyphaga
- Infraorder: Scarabaeiformia
- Family: Scarabaeidae
- Genus: Dasyvalgus
- Species: D. becvariensis

Binomial name
- Dasyvalgus becvariensis Ricchiardi, 2015

Species of beetle

Dasyvalgus becvariensis is a species of beetle of the family Scarabaeidae. It is found in China (Sichuan, Yunnan).

== Description ==
Adults reach a length of about 6.8–7 mm (0.27–0.28 in). They have a brown, slightly shiny head, covered with large punctures and with testaceous, bristle like scales. The pronotum is dark brown, covered with testaceous or white scales. The elytra are slightly shiny, mostly glabrous and brown or black in some places and partly covered with black or testaceous, small scales.

== Etymology ==
The species is dedicated to Stanislav Bečvář, who first collected the species.
