= Dasyvalgus sabahi =

Scientific classification
- Kingdom: Animalia
- Phylum: Arthropoda
- Clade: Pancrustacea
- Class: Insecta
- Order: Coleoptera
- Suborder: Polyphaga
- Infraorder: Scarabaeiformia
- Family: Scarabaeidae
- Genus: Dasyvalgus
- Species: D. sabahi

Binomial name
- Dasyvalgus sabahi Ricchiardi, 2013

Species of beetle

Dasyvalgus sabahi is a species of beetle of the family Scarabaeidae. It is found in Malaysia (Sabah).

== Description ==
Adults reach a length of about 5.8 mm (0.23 in). The body and head are black and the pronotum is slightly shiny and with six tufts of black scales on the disc. The elytra are slightly shiny and covered with black scales and with a row of small white scales in the center of disc, as well as a rounded spot of black scales on the upper side.
