= Comythovalgus fasciculatus =

Scientific classification
- Kingdom: Animalia
- Phylum: Arthropoda
- Clade: Pancrustacea
- Class: Insecta
- Order: Coleoptera
- Suborder: Polyphaga
- Infraorder: Scarabaeiformia
- Family: Scarabaeidae
- Genus: Comythovalgus
- Species: C. fasciculatus

Binomial name
- Comythovalgus fasciculatus (Gyllenhal, 1817)

Synonyms
- Trichius fasciculatus Gyllenhal, 1817

Species of beetle

Comythovalgus fasciculatus is a species of beetle of the family Scarabaeidae. It is found in Democratic Republic of the Congo and South Africa (Eastern Cape, KwaZulu-Natal).

== Description ==
Adults reach a length of about 5–5.25 mm (0.197–0.207 in). They are fuscous, entirely covered with extremely dense scale-like, appressed, light fulvous hairs, and with a very plain, lighter-coloured patch of scales on each side of the scutellum. The head has two small fascicles of hairs and the pronotum has ten fascicles of squamose hairs. The elytra are almost twice as broad as the pronotum, narrower at apex than at the base, vertical laterally, leaving the sides of the dorsal part of the abdominal segments uncovered as well as the propygidium, they have on each side four fascicles of squamiform hairs. The broad propygidium has two long ones at the apical margin, and the pygidium two in the centre, and two smaller ones at the apex.
