= Heterovalgus =

Scientific classification
- Kingdom: Animalia
- Phylum: Arthropoda
- Clade: Pancrustacea
- Class: Insecta
- Order: Coleoptera
- Suborder: Polyphaga
- Infraorder: Scarabaeiformia
- Family: Scarabaeidae
- Subfamily: Cetoniinae
- Tribe: Valgini
- Genus: Heterovalgus; Krikken, 1978

Genus of leaf beetles

Heterovalgus is a genus of beetles belonging to the family Scarabaeidae.

== Species ==
- Heterovalgus alberti Ricchiardi, 1992
- Heterovalgus antoinei Ricchiardi, 1992
- Heterovalgus itohi Miyake, 1994
- Heterovalgus mangolensis Ricchiardi, 1995
- Heterovalgus poggii Ricchiardi, 1992
- Heterovalgus popei Krikken, 1978
