= Dasyvalgus benesi =

Scientific classification
- Kingdom: Animalia
- Phylum: Arthropoda
- Clade: Pancrustacea
- Class: Insecta
- Order: Coleoptera
- Suborder: Polyphaga
- Infraorder: Scarabaeiformia
- Family: Scarabaeidae
- Genus: Dasyvalgus
- Species: D. benesi

Binomial name
- Dasyvalgus benesi Ricchiardi, 2015

Species of beetle

Dasyvalgus benesi is a species of beetle of the family Scarabaeidae. It is found in China (Gansu, Hubei, Shaanxi, Sichuan).

== Description ==
Adults reach a length of about 5.4–8 mm (0.21–0.31 in). They have a black, slightly shiny head, covered with large punctures and very scattered, bristle-like, testaceous scales. The pronotum is brown, covered with scattered, testaceous scales and with black and testaceous scale tufts. The elytra are slightly shiny, mostly glabrous, and partly covered with black, white or testaceous, small scales.

== Etymology ==
The species is dedicated to the Czech entomologist J. Beneš, who collected some of the types.
