= Dasyvalgus sommershofi =

Scientific classification
- Kingdom: Animalia
- Phylum: Arthropoda
- Clade: Pancrustacea
- Class: Insecta
- Order: Coleoptera
- Suborder: Polyphaga
- Infraorder: Scarabaeiformia
- Family: Scarabaeidae
- Genus: Dasyvalgus
- Species: D. sommershofi

Binomial name
- Dasyvalgus sommershofi Endrödi, 1952

Species of beetle

Dasyvalgus sommershofi is a species of beetle of the family Scarabaeidae. It is found in China (Fujian, Zhejiang).

== Description ==
Adults reach a length of about 5.8 mm (0.23 in). They have a brown body, while the head is black, slightly shiny and covered with scattered, testaceous scales. The pronotum is brown, shiny and covered with large, rounded punctuations, many with containing a white, cretaceous marking. The elytra are brown, shiny and mostly glabrous.
