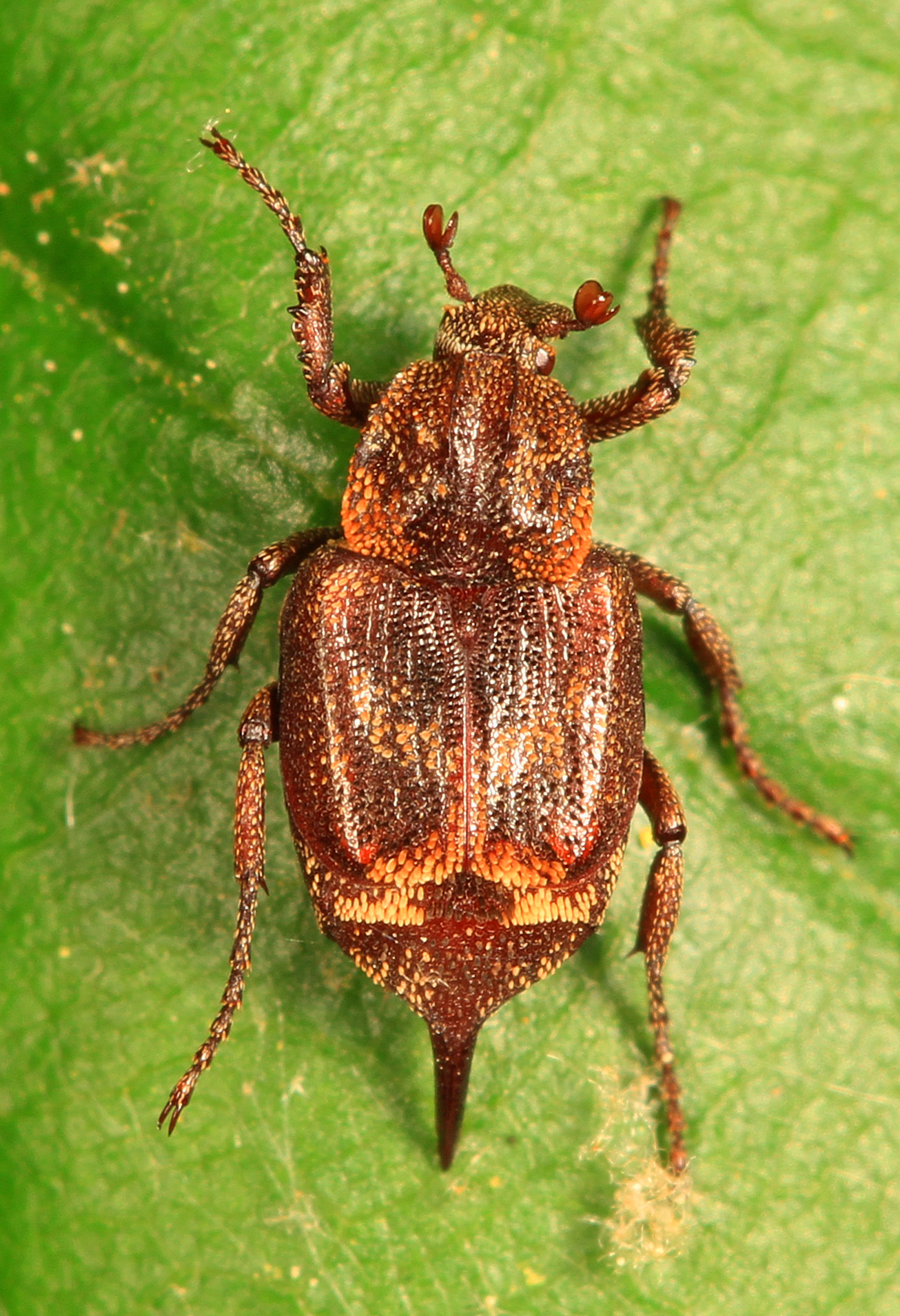

Scientific classification
- Kingdom: Animalia
- Phylum: Arthropoda
- Clade: Pancrustacea
- Class: Insecta
- Order: Coleoptera
- Suborder: Polyphaga
- Infraorder: Scarabaeiformia
- Family: Scarabaeidae
- Genus: Valgus
- Species: V. canaliculatus

Binomial name
- Valgus canaliculatus (Olivier, 1789)

Synonyms
- Trichius variegatus Palisot de Beauvois, 1805; Valgus minutus Casey, 1909; Valgus serricollis Fitch, 1858

= Valgus canaliculatus =

Species of beetle

Valgus canaliculatus is a species of scarab beetle in the family Scarabaeidae. It is found in North America.
