= Acanthovalgus =

Scientific classification
- Kingdom: Animalia
- Phylum: Arthropoda
- Clade: Pancrustacea
- Class: Insecta
- Order: Coleoptera
- Suborder: Polyphaga
- Infraorder: Scarabaeiformia
- Family: Scarabaeidae
- Subfamily: Cetoniinae
- Tribe: Valgini
- Genus: Acanthovalgus; Kraatz, 1895

Genus of leaf beetles

Acanthovalgus is a genus of beetles belonging to the family Scarabaeidae.

== Species ==
- Acanthovalgus furcifer (Westwood, 1878)
- Acanthovalgus javanicus (Burmeister, 1842)
- Acanthovalgus marquardi Kraatz, 1895
- Acanthovalgus peninsularis Arrow, 1944
- Acanthovalgus uniformis Moser, 1914
