= Dasyvalgus motuoensis =

Scientific classification
- Kingdom: Animalia
- Phylum: Arthropoda
- Clade: Pancrustacea
- Class: Insecta
- Order: Coleoptera
- Suborder: Polyphaga
- Infraorder: Scarabaeiformia
- Family: Scarabaeidae
- Genus: Dasyvalgus
- Species: D. motuoensis

Binomial name
- Dasyvalgus motuoensis Ricchiardi, 2015

Species of beetle

Dasyvalgus motuoensis is a species of beetle of the family Scarabaeidae. It is found in China (Xizang).

== Description ==
Adults reach a length of about 5.4–5.9 mm (0.21–0.23 in). They have a black body, with the head slightly shiny, covered with small punctures and yellowish scales forming two small scale tufts on the frons. The pronotum is covered with long, C-shaped yellowish scales and the elytra are also covered with mostly yellowish scales, although they are black in some areas.
