= Valgus californicus =

Scientific classification
- Domain: Eukaryota
- Kingdom: Animalia
- Phylum: Arthropoda
- Class: Insecta
- Order: Coleoptera
- Suborder: Polyphaga
- Infraorder: Scarabaeiformia
- Family: Scarabaeidae
- Genus: Valgus
- Species: V. californicus

Binomial name
- Valgus californicus Horn, 1870

Species of beetle

Valgus californicus is a species of scarab beetle in the family Scarabaeidae. It is found in Central America and North America.
