= Dasyvalgus frenzeli =

Scientific classification
- Kingdom: Animalia
- Phylum: Arthropoda
- Clade: Pancrustacea
- Class: Insecta
- Order: Coleoptera
- Suborder: Polyphaga
- Infraorder: Scarabaeiformia
- Family: Scarabaeidae
- Genus: Dasyvalgus
- Species: D. frenzeli

Binomial name
- Dasyvalgus frenzeli Ricchiardi, 2013

Species of beetle

Dasyvalgus frenzeli is a species of beetle of the family Scarabaeidae. It is found in Vietnam.

== Description ==
Adults reach a length of about 5.8 mm (0.23 in). The body is dark brown and the head is shiny and covered with large, umbilicate punctures. The pronotum has black scale tufts and four tufts of scales at the base (two are whitish, while the other two are black). The elytra are slightly shiny and covered with whitish scales.
