= Comythovalgus gedyei =

Scientific classification
- Kingdom: Animalia
- Phylum: Arthropoda
- Clade: Pancrustacea
- Class: Insecta
- Order: Coleoptera
- Suborder: Polyphaga
- Infraorder: Scarabaeiformia
- Family: Scarabaeidae
- Genus: Comythovalgus
- Species: C. gedyei

Binomial name
- Comythovalgus gedyei Schein, 1956

Species of beetle

Comythovalgus gedyei is a species of beetle of the family Scarabaeidae. It is found in Kenya.

== Description ==
Adults reach a length of about 4.5 mm (0.18 in). They are characterized by a strong contrast between black and white in its colouration. Both sexes are similar. The shape of the body shape is similar to other Comythovalgus species, with the pronotum narrower than the elytra.
