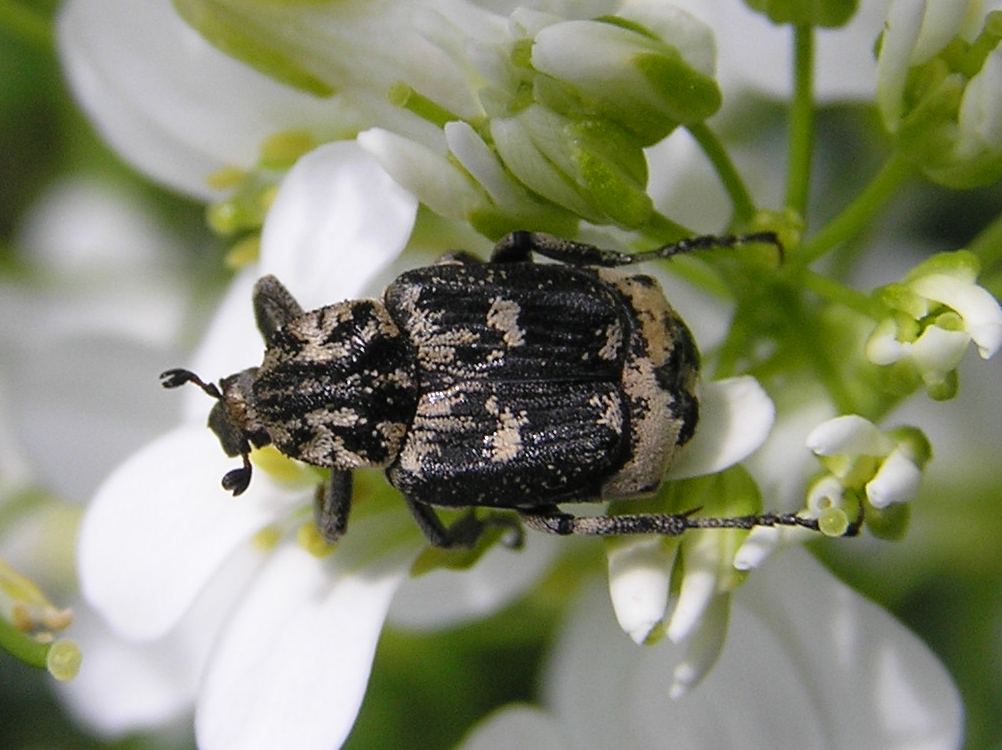
- Male
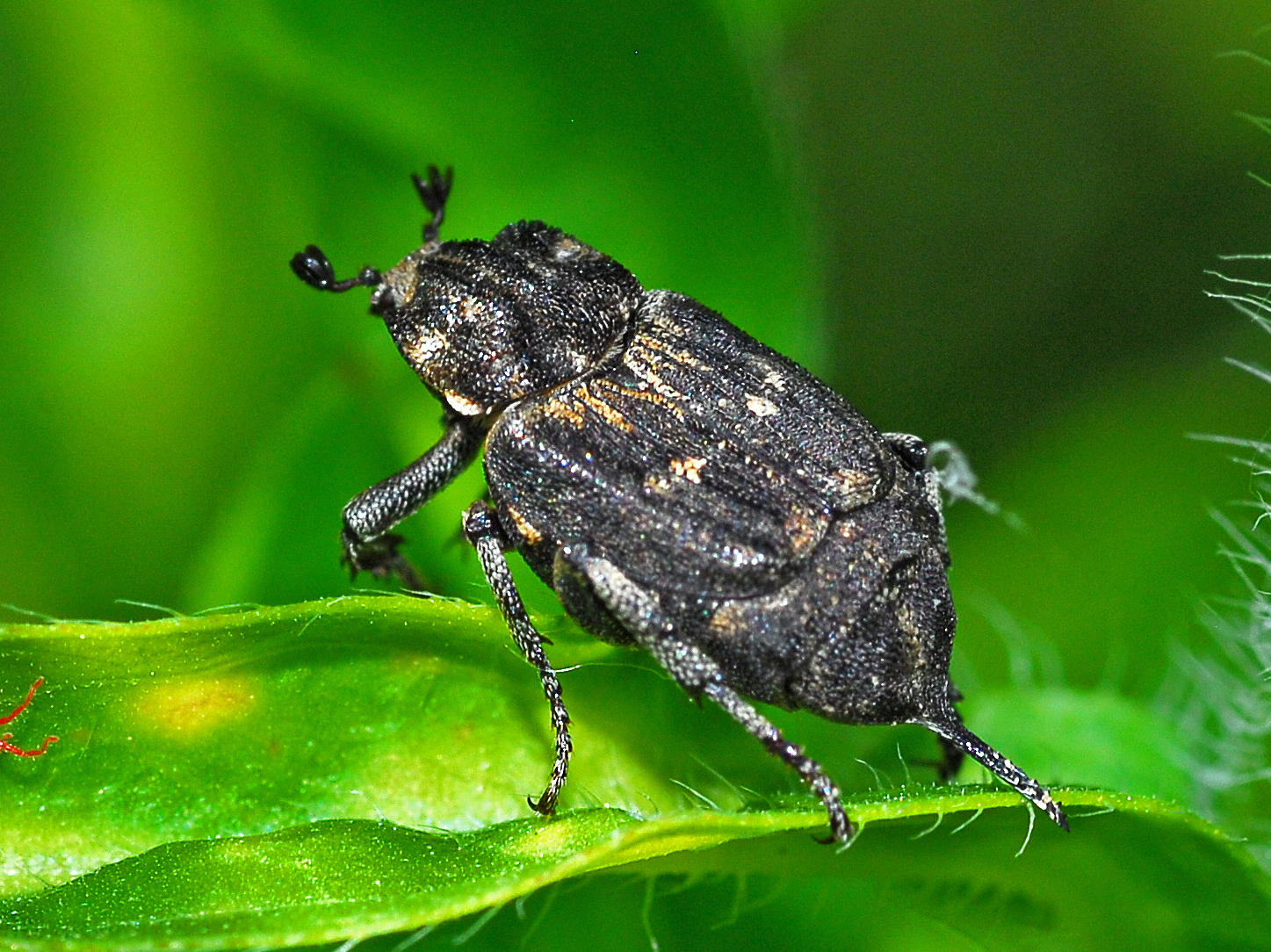
- Female, showing the acuminate telson

Scientific classification
- Kingdom: Animalia
- Phylum: Arthropoda
- Clade: Pancrustacea
- Class: Insecta
- Order: Coleoptera
- Suborder: Polyphaga
- Infraorder: Scarabaeiformia
- Family: Scarabaeidae
- Genus: Valgus
- Species: V. hemipterus

Binomial name
- Valgus hemipterus (Linnaeus, 1758)

Synonyms
- Scarabaeus hemipterus Linnaeus, 1758

= Valgus hemipterus =

Species of beetle

Valgus hemipterus is a smallish species of scarab beetle (family Scarabaeidae) found in the Northern Hemisphere.

== Subspecies ==
Subspecies include:

- Valgus hemipterus hemipterus (Linnaeus, 1758)
- Valgus hemipterus meridionalis Rössner, 2014

== Distribution ==
This species occurs from the Caucasus and Turkey to North Africa and southern and central Europe (Albania, Austria, Belarus, Belgium, Bosnia and Herzegovina, Bulgaria, Central European Russia, Croatia, Cyprus, Czech Republic, Denmark, European Turkey, France, Germany, Greece, Hungary, Italy, Latvia, Lithuania, Luxembourg, Republic of North Macedonia, Northwest European Russia, Poland, Portugal, Romania, Slovakia, Slovenia, South European Russia, Spain, Switzerland, The Netherlands, Ukraine, Yugoslavia).

The species has been introduced to the Nearctic realm, in parts of North America, especially Ontario, Michigan and Ohio.

== Description ==
This species reaches a body length of 6–10 mm. The basic color is black or dark brown. The scales on the body of the male are dark brown with a light pattern, while most scales in females are dark. Pronotum is rather serrate along lateral edges, a transverse medial ridges is not well developed and basal margin is quite rounded. The elytrae are shortened and do not cover the entire body. Pronotum and elytra show patches of light-colored setae.

Females bear a striking long acuminate telson - unusual fact in Coleoptera - with a central groove near apex and irregular lateral serrations, which makes them easily distinguishable from the males. In addition, The males have a different drawing than the females.

== Biology ==
These beetles, which can be found from early April to August on flowers or wood, are relatively common. The species has one generation (univoltine) and hibernates as a pupa. Unlike other species of the subfamily, during courtship the male climbs and licks the female's entire body, and this lasts about ten minutes. It often happens that 2 or 3 mating attempts are unsuccessful. During mating, the male attaches himself from below and grabs the female because the ovipositor interferes. Mating lasts about 1 hour. Matings occur only inside dark cavities of the host wood from mid-May to late June.

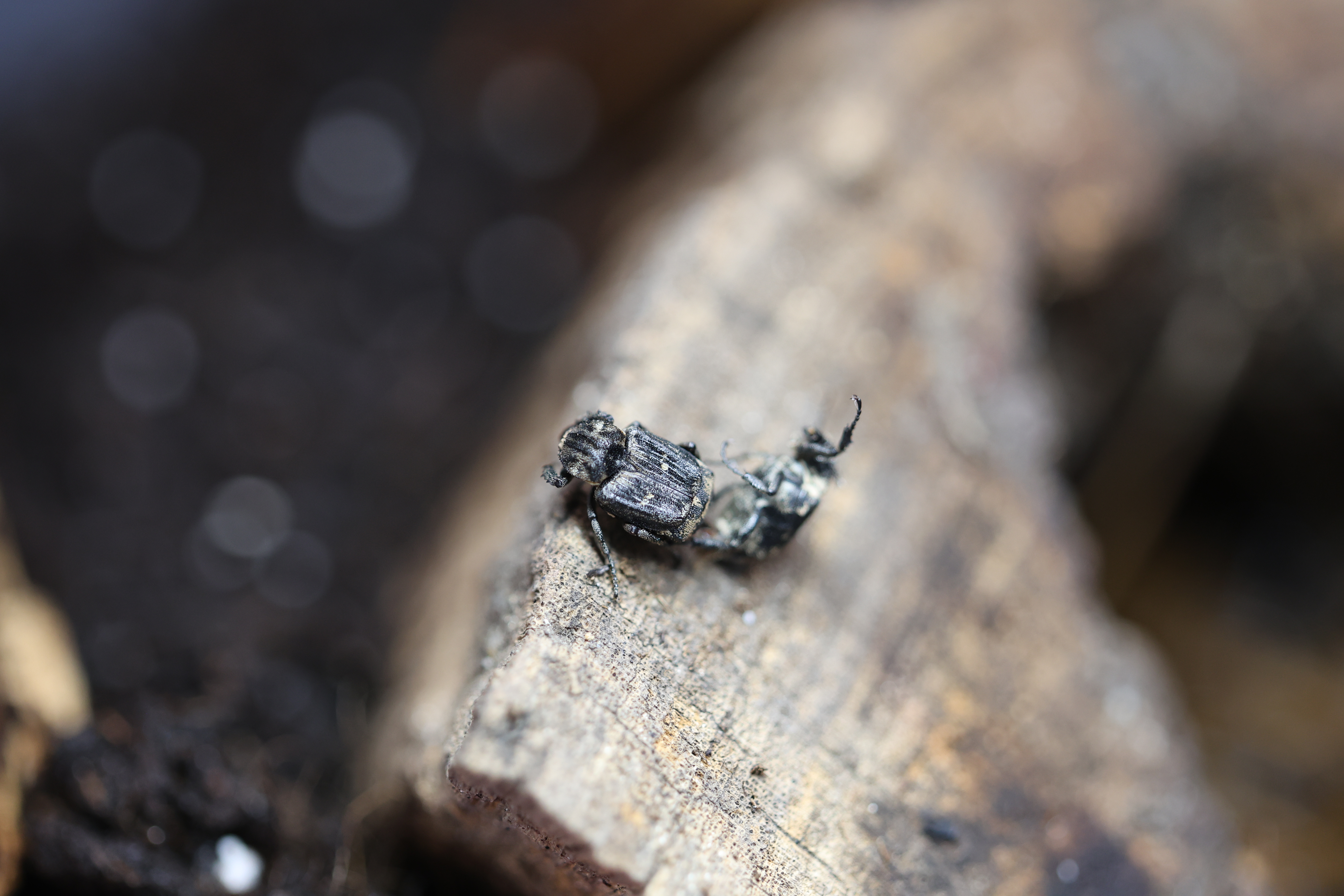
Mating of adults

Adult females usually oviposit to moist, rotting wood and use their acuminate telson to create the site of oviposition. Laying takes place outdoors. The female is constantly moving and moving the wood flakes from the laying site. This process lasts for over an hour, and 30 minutes late, a yellow pile begins to form behind the female. Cracks, loose parts of the wood, bark, etc. are chosen for egg oviposition. The preferred hosts of the larvae are oak, linden, elder, willow, elm, Robinia and chestnut. The egglaying take place aroung mid-May to late June.

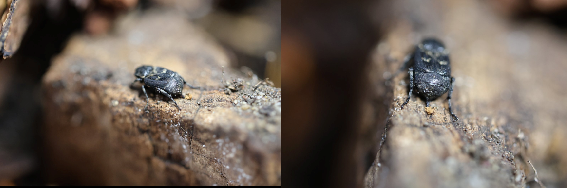
Close-up and side view of the laying

The egg is quite elongated, very pale white and somewhat oval-shaped.It is laid in the harder and more protected parts of the wood.

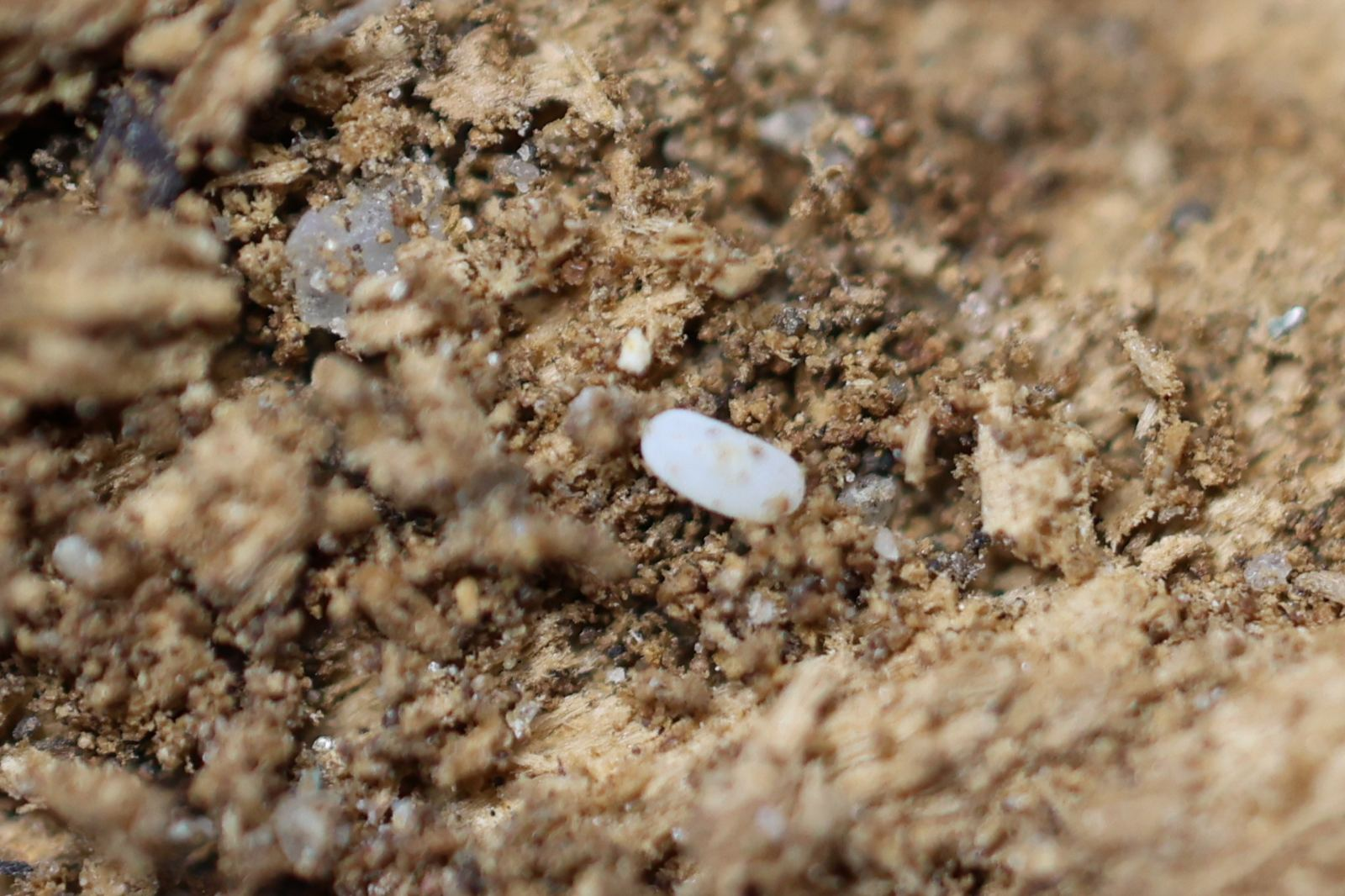
The first detailed image of the egg

The newly-hatched larva emerges from the egg after approximately 18 days. It is 1.1 mm long and has a very large head compared to its small body. The labrum and the labium are reddish orange, and the basic color is whitish. The larvae are very sticky and tender at this stage of their life. Later in the first instar (when the larva is a few days old, the front of the head becomes gray and the back is whitish. The middle part of the body is gray again, and the pygidium is rusty-brown behind. Very large maxillary palps. At first the larvae make small rooms in the wood.

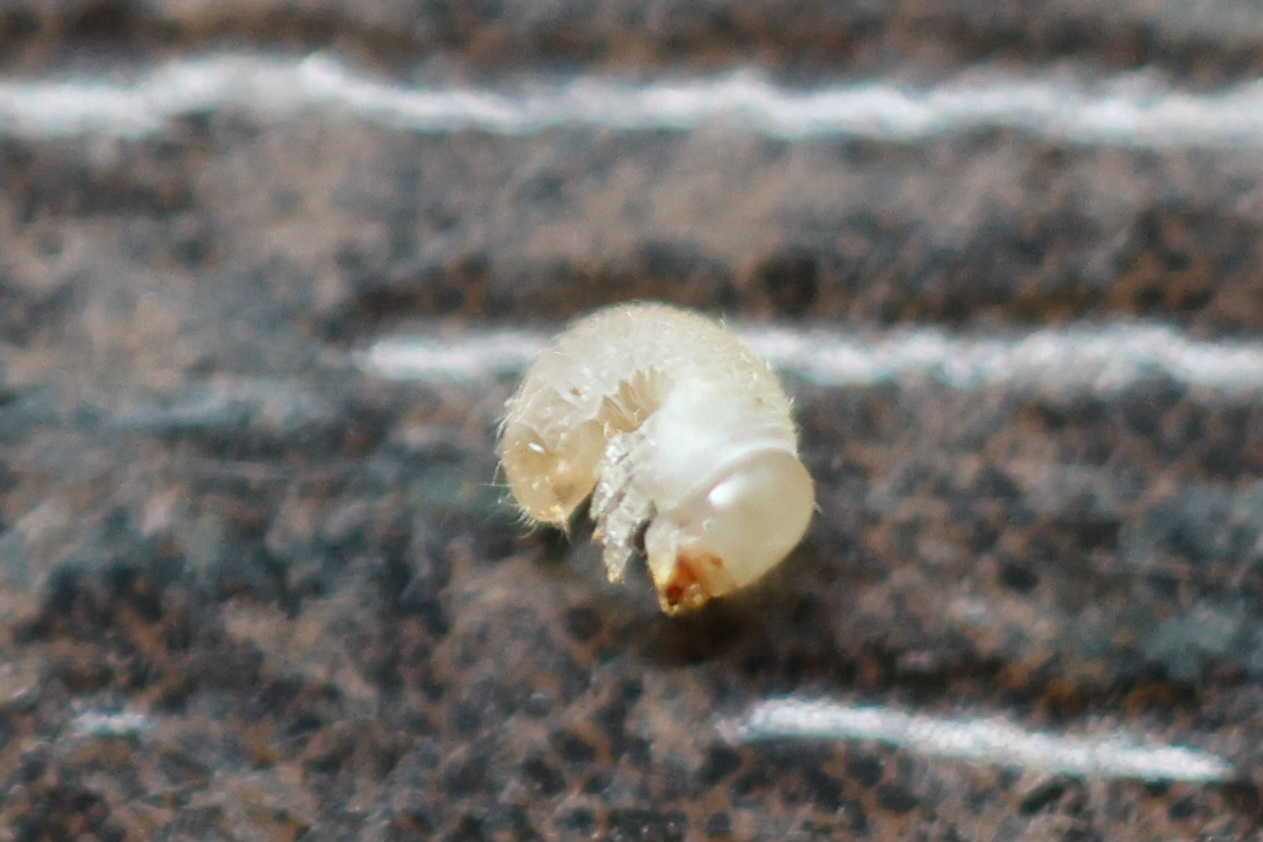
The newly-hatched larva (this larva is about 3 hours old and you can clearly see the pretty big head capsule, compared to the length of the body

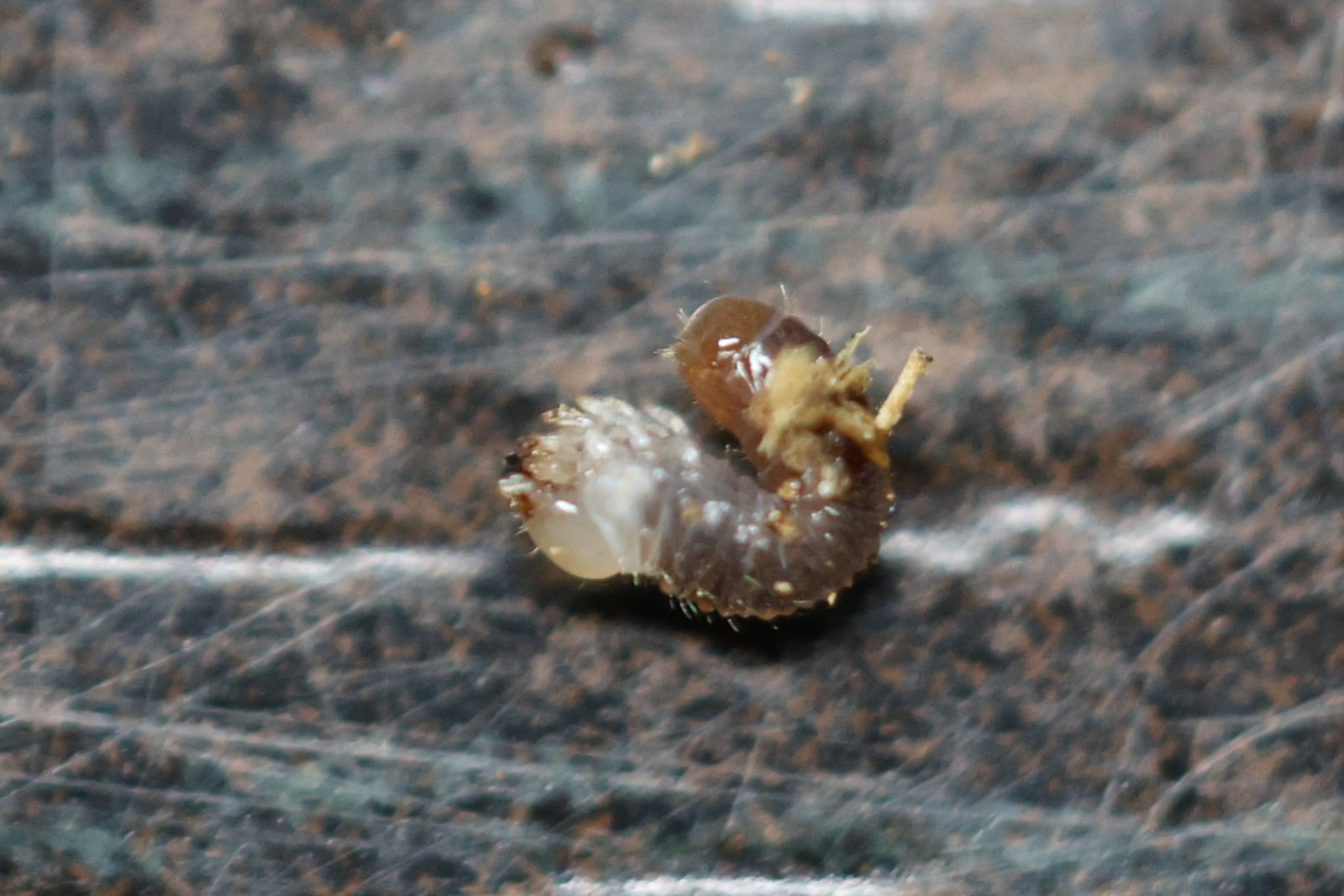
Bigger L1 (the larva is 5-6 days old)

22 to 28 days after hatching and the first instar, the larvae molt to the 2nd instar, which is different from the first, especially in the area at the end of the abdomen, which has something like a hump on top and it's not as transparent as the first. It is dark burgundy red and quite enlarged.

The larva in early stage 2 is a little over 9 mm. The larvae of this species grow most rapidly in the summer, when it is hot, because they prefer more dry substrate and higher temperature to develop properly. The head is orange with very high raised eyelids. The mandibles are elongated and almost completely black. Very active, often located just below the surface of the bark of the host wood. However, in this species the two orange spots on the sides of the head are very small and pale, more like outlines next to the head. Especially around the head it is pale and yellowish. The overall color is dark gray with hints of blue, but it is no longer visible later.

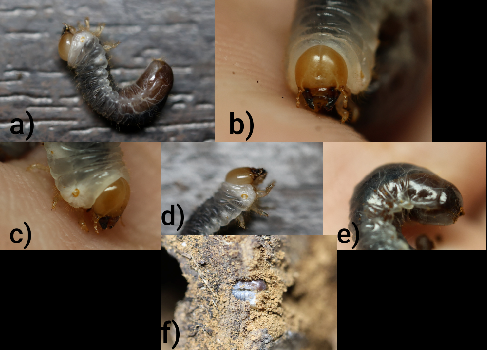
The 2nd instar (a- habitus of the larva, b- close-up of the head, c- head and pronotal segments (ventral), d- pronotum and legs, e- end of the abdomen, f- larva inside the wood

Around 19 days after the second stage, they molt to the 3rd. In nature this stage occurs around August. The biggest difference with the 2nd instar is that not only the first segments of the pronotum are light, but the white light color passes by the 3rd stage. The larva reaches a maximum size of 17 mm and will eventually pupate in the wood or in the ground beneath it by mid-autumn, but development has sometimes been recorded over a year.

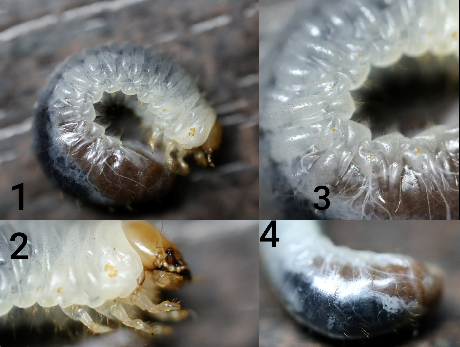
Fully-grown larva (1- habitus, 2- close-up of legs and head, 3- segments of the body, 4- abdominal end)

Before pupating, the larva apparently stays for 4 days after the formation of the pupal cell until it finds a good position to shed its skin. The pupa has a characteristic elongated pygidium. The pupa stage lasts for about 15 days.

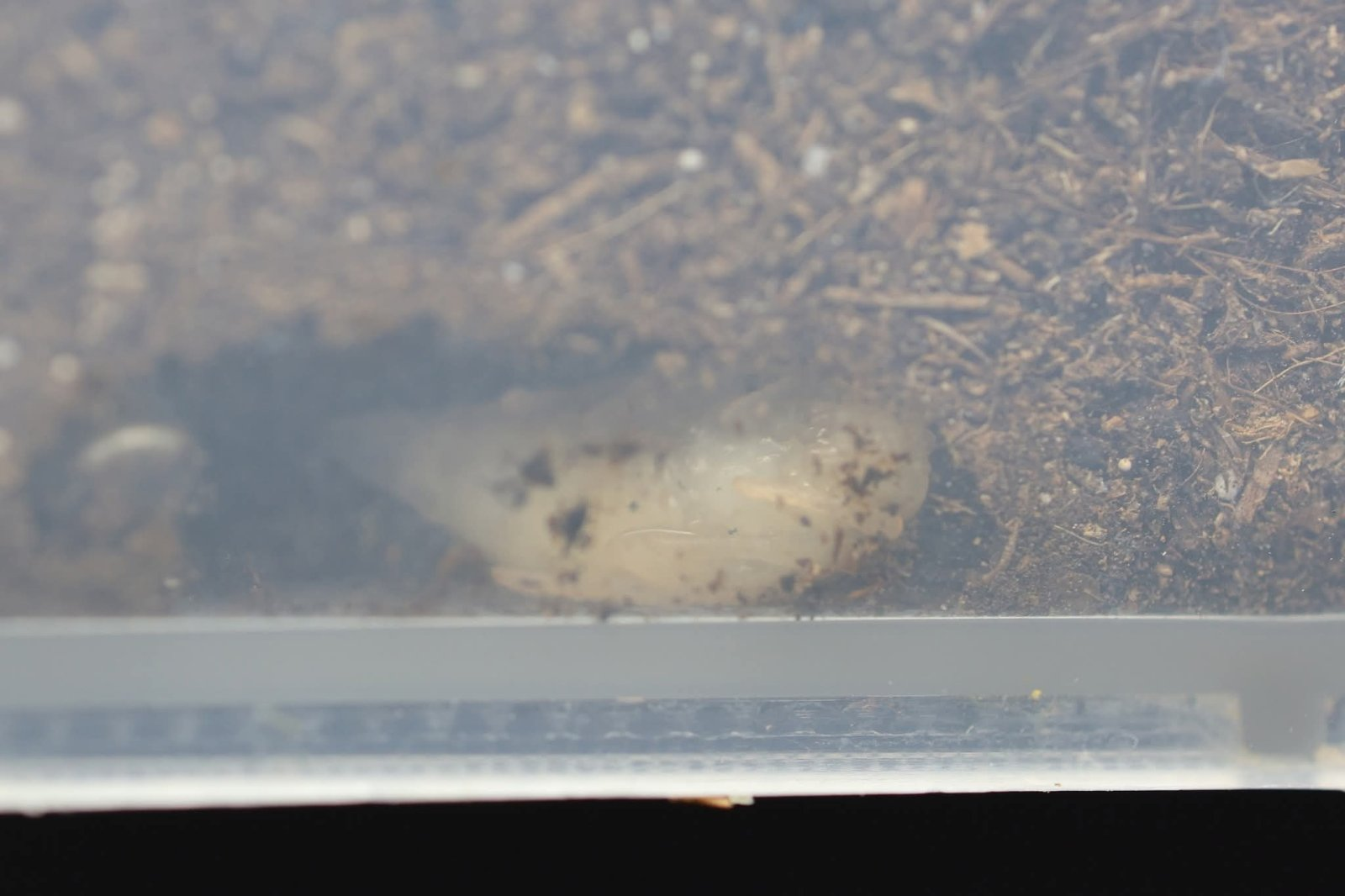
The interesting elongated pupa of Valgus hemipterus

== Behavior and habitat ==
They are found in a range of habitats, such as vineyards, urban areas, etc., and they are active in warm weather when they visit flowers of various shrubs. The weather is important because the most activity occurs on warm, cloudy days or when the sun is slightly shining through the clouds. Males are usually found on flowers, while females are seen walking on the ground in alleys, lawns, or on stumps, looking for mates or suitable places to lay eggs. They come less often to flowers. In late May and early June they may form swarms where they breed. These swarms disperse at a later time.

== Gallery ==
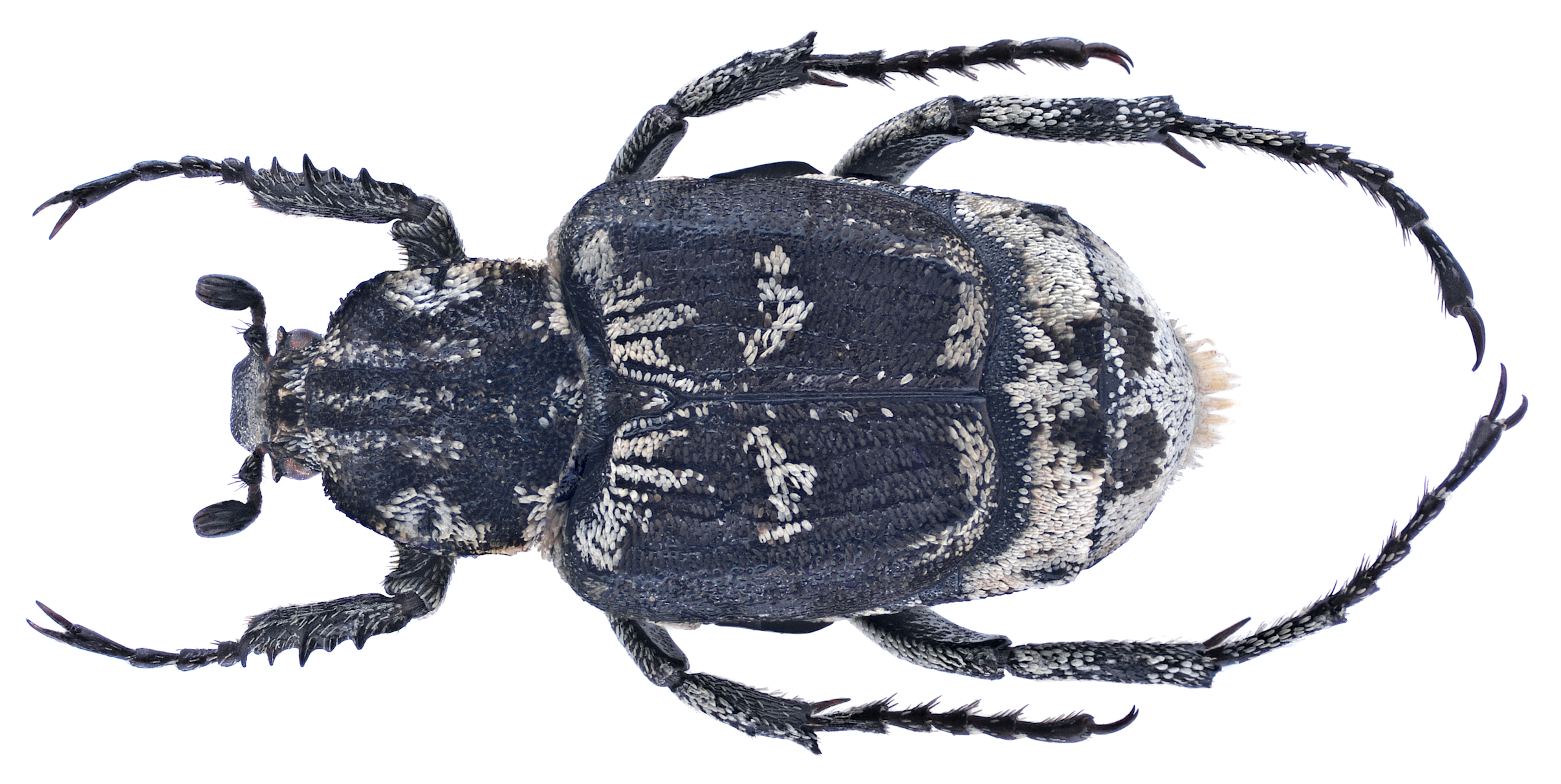
Mounted specimen of a male.

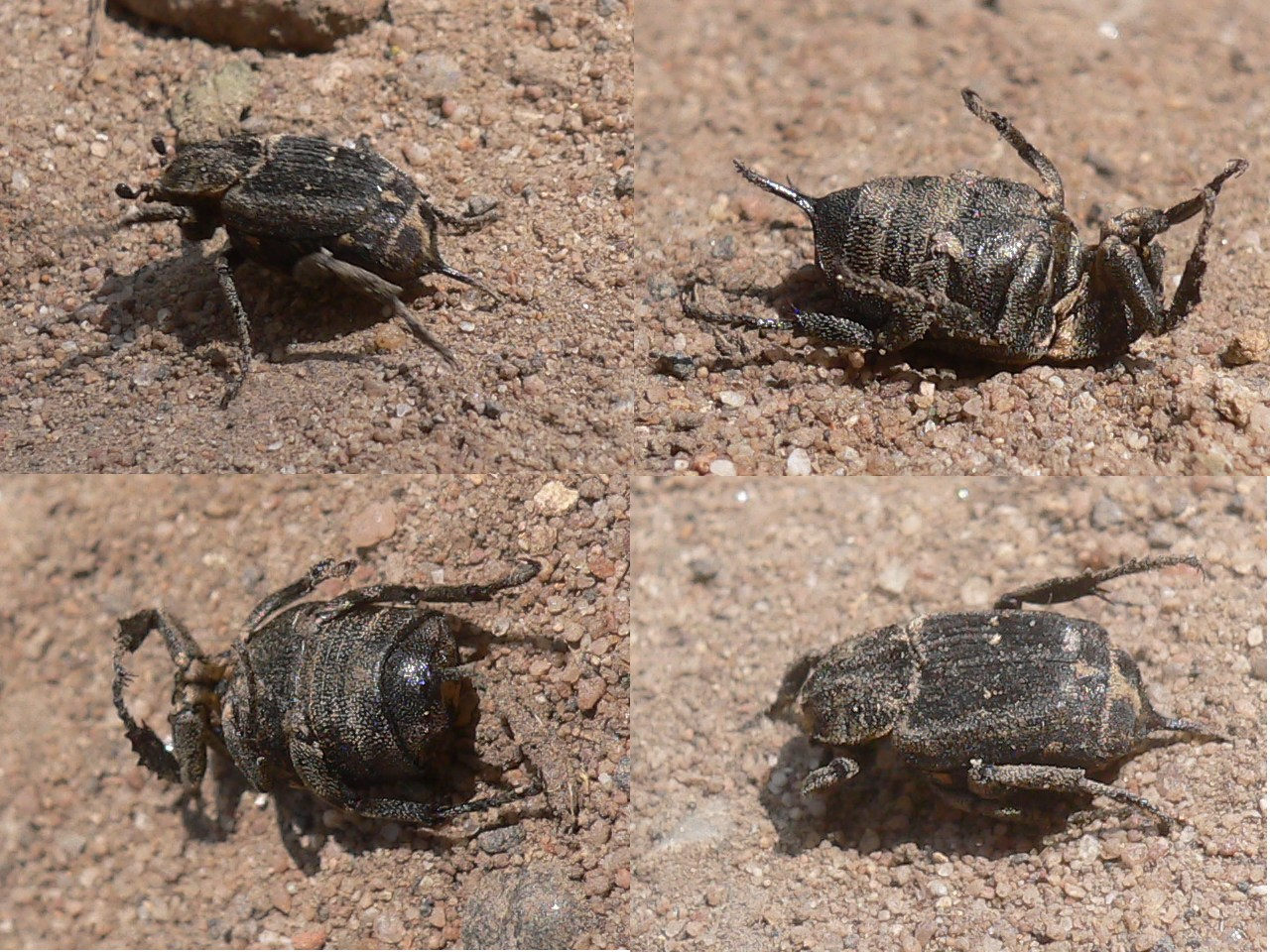
Female, from different angles

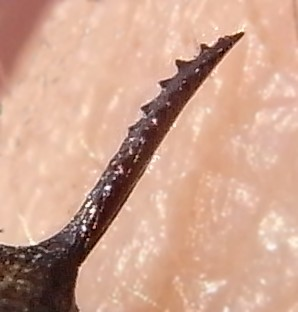
Detail of female telson

Male. Video clip

== Bibliography ==
- Harde, Severa: Der Kosmos Käferführer, Die mitteleuropäischen Käfer, Franckh-Kosmos Verlags-GmbH & Co, Stuttgart 2000, ISBN 3-440-06959-1 (German)
- Möller, G., Schneider, M. (1991): Kommentierte Liste ausgewählter Familien überwiegend holzbewohnender Käfer von Berlin-West mit Ausweisung der gefährdeten Arten (Rote Liste). In: Auhagen, A., Platen, R., Sukopp, H. (Hrsg.): Rote Listen gefährdeter Pflanzen und Tiere in Berlin. - Landschaftsentwicklung und Umweltforschung, Sonderheft 6, 1991: S. 373-420. (German)
- Jiři Zahradník, Irmgard Jung, Dieter Jung et al.: Käfer Mittel- und Nordwesteuropas, Parey Berlin 1985, ISBN 3-490-27118-1 (German)
