= Synistovalgus minutus =

Scientific classification
- Kingdom: Animalia
- Phylum: Arthropoda
- Clade: Pancrustacea
- Class: Insecta
- Order: Coleoptera
- Suborder: Polyphaga
- Infraorder: Scarabaeiformia
- Family: Scarabaeidae
- Genus: Synistovalgus
- Species: S. minutus

Binomial name
- Synistovalgus minutus Kolbe, 1897

Species of beetle

Synistovalgus minutus is a species of beetle of the family Scarabaeidae. It is found in Cameroon and Equatorial Guinea (Bioko).

== Description ==
Adults reach a length of about 2.7–2.9 mm (0.11–0.11 in). They are black, with yellowish scales all over the body and with yellow tomentum, consisting of a line at the apex of the scutellum, a small spot in front of the middle on each elytron, the propygidium and the pygidium.
