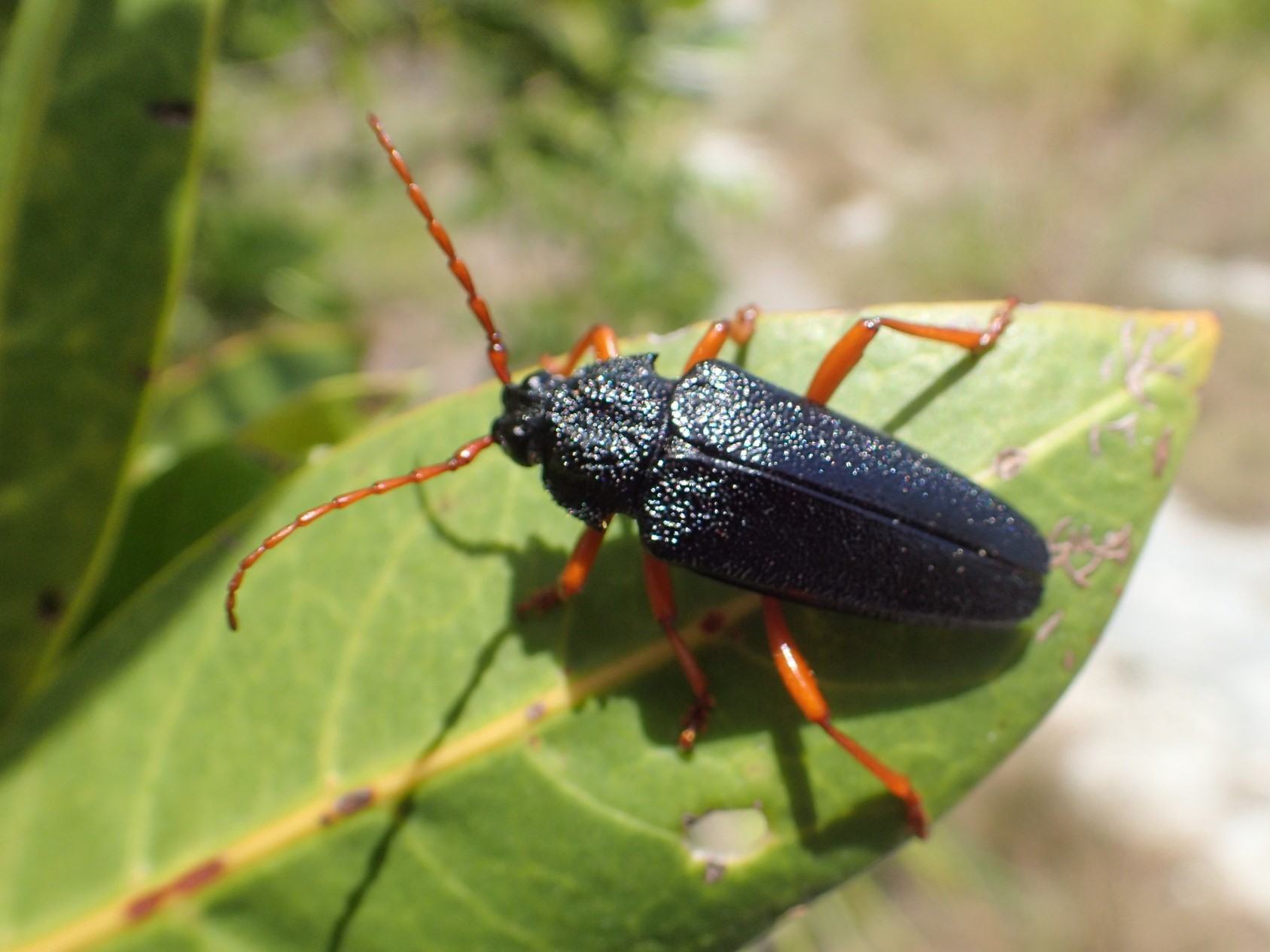

Scientific classification
- Kingdom: Animalia
- Phylum: Arthropoda
- Clade: Pancrustacea
- Class: Insecta
- Order: Coleoptera
- Suborder: Polyphaga
- Infraorder: Cucujiformia
- Family: Cerambycidae
- Genus: Elateropsis
- Species: E. scabrosa

Binomial name
- Elateropsis scabrosa Gahan, 1890

Synonyms
- Elateropsis castaneous (Zayas, 1975)

= Elateropsis scabrosa =

Species of beetle

Elateropsis scabrosa is a species of long-horned beetle in the family Cerambycidae. It is found in the Caribbean and North America.

Its diet consists mostly of plants, fungi, and other bugs. The main sightings of this beetle have been in Florida, United States, and in Cuba.
