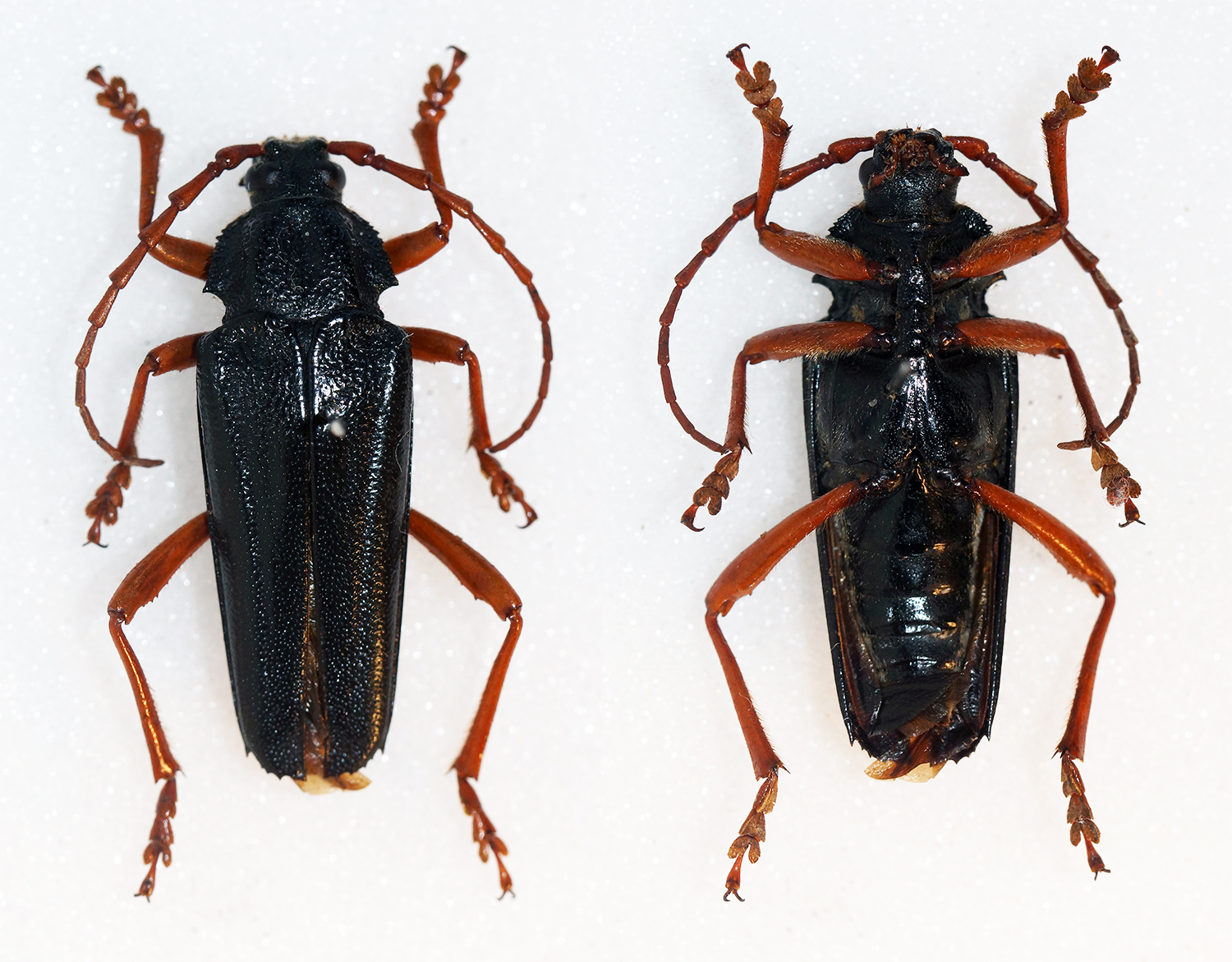

Scientific classification
- Kingdom: Animalia
- Phylum: Arthropoda
- Clade: Pancrustacea
- Class: Insecta
- Order: Coleoptera
- Suborder: Polyphaga
- Infraorder: Cucujiformia
- Family: Cerambycidae
- Genus: Elateropsis
- Species: E. lineata

Binomial name
- Elateropsis lineata (Linnaeus, 1758)

= Elateropsis lineata =

Species of beetle

Elateropsis lineata is a species of beetle in the family Cerambycidae found in South America in countries such as Chile.
