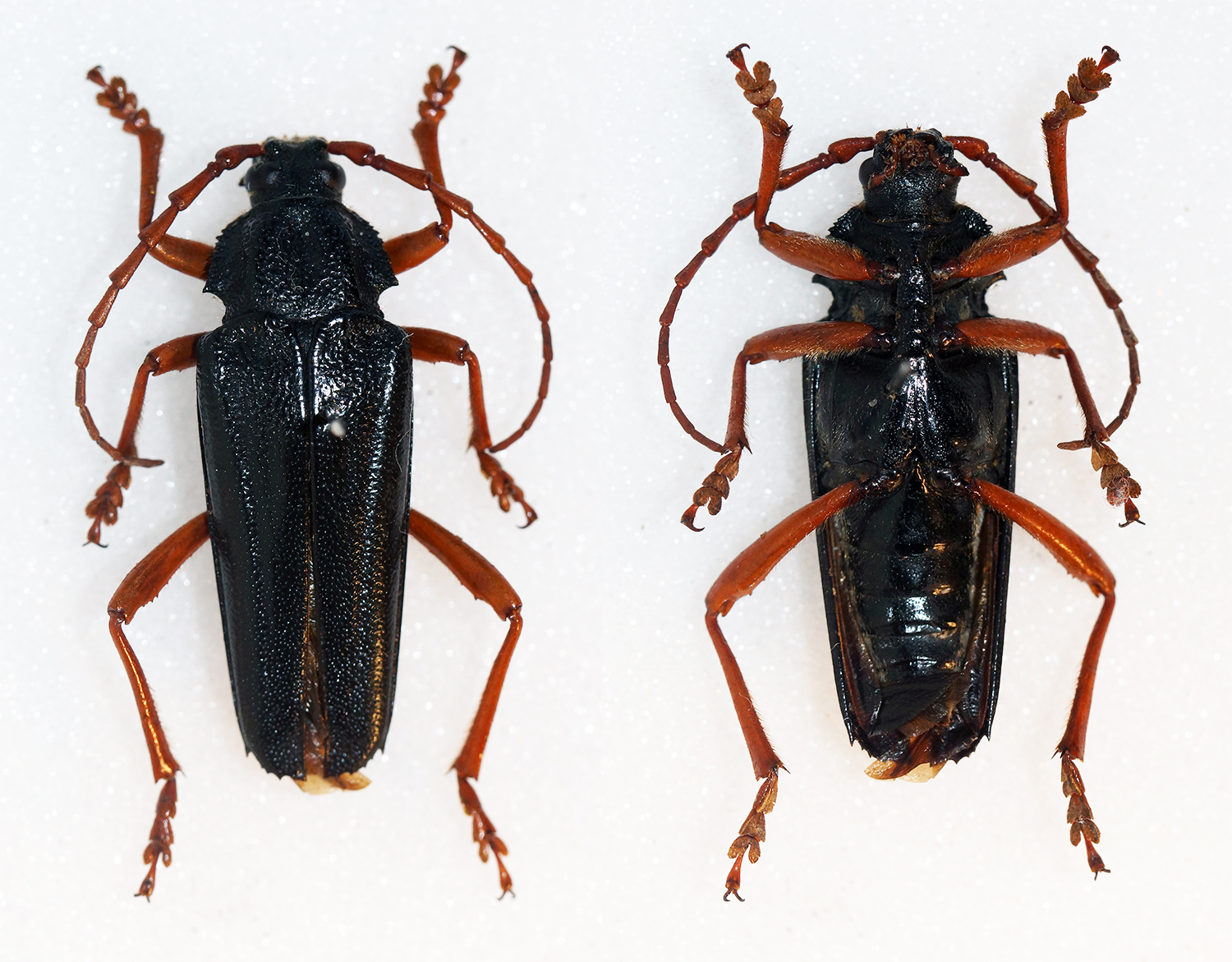
- Elateropsis lineatus

Scientific classification
- Kingdom: Animalia
- Phylum: Arthropoda
- Clade: Pancrustacea
- Class: Insecta
- Order: Coleoptera
- Suborder: Polyphaga
- Infraorder: Cucujiformia
- Family: Cerambycidae
- Subfamily: Prioninae
- Tribe: Solenopterini
- Genus: Elateropsis; Chevrolat 1862

= Elateropsis =

Genus of beetles

Elateropsis is a genus of beetles in the family Cerambycidae, containing the following species:

- Elateropsis antennata Galileo & Martins, 1994
- Elateropsis bahamica Galileo & Martins, 1994
- Elateropsis castanea (Zayas, 1975)
- Elateropsis caymanensis (Fisher, 1941)
- Elateropsis dichroma Lingafelter 2015
- Elateropsis ebenina Chevrolat, 1862
- Elateropsis fellerae (Chemsak, 1983)
- Elateropsis femorata (Sallé, 1855)
- Elateropsis foliacea Galileo & Martins, 1994
- Elateropsis fulvipes (Chevrolat in Guérin-Méneville, 1838)
- Elateropsis julio Lingafelter & Micheli, 2004
- Elateropsis lineata (Linnaeus, 1758)
- Elateropsis nigricornis (Fisher, 1941)
- Elateropsis nigripes (Fisher, 1941)
- Elateropsis peregrina Galileo & Martins, 1994
- Elateropsis quinquenotata Chevrolat, 1862
- Elateropsis reticulata Gahan, 1890
- Elateropsis rugosa Gahan, 1890
- Elateropsis scabrosa Gahan, 1890
- Elateropsis sericeiventris Chevrolat, 1862
- Elateropsis trimarginata (Cazier & Lacey, 1952)
- Elateropsis woodleyi Lingafelter 2015
