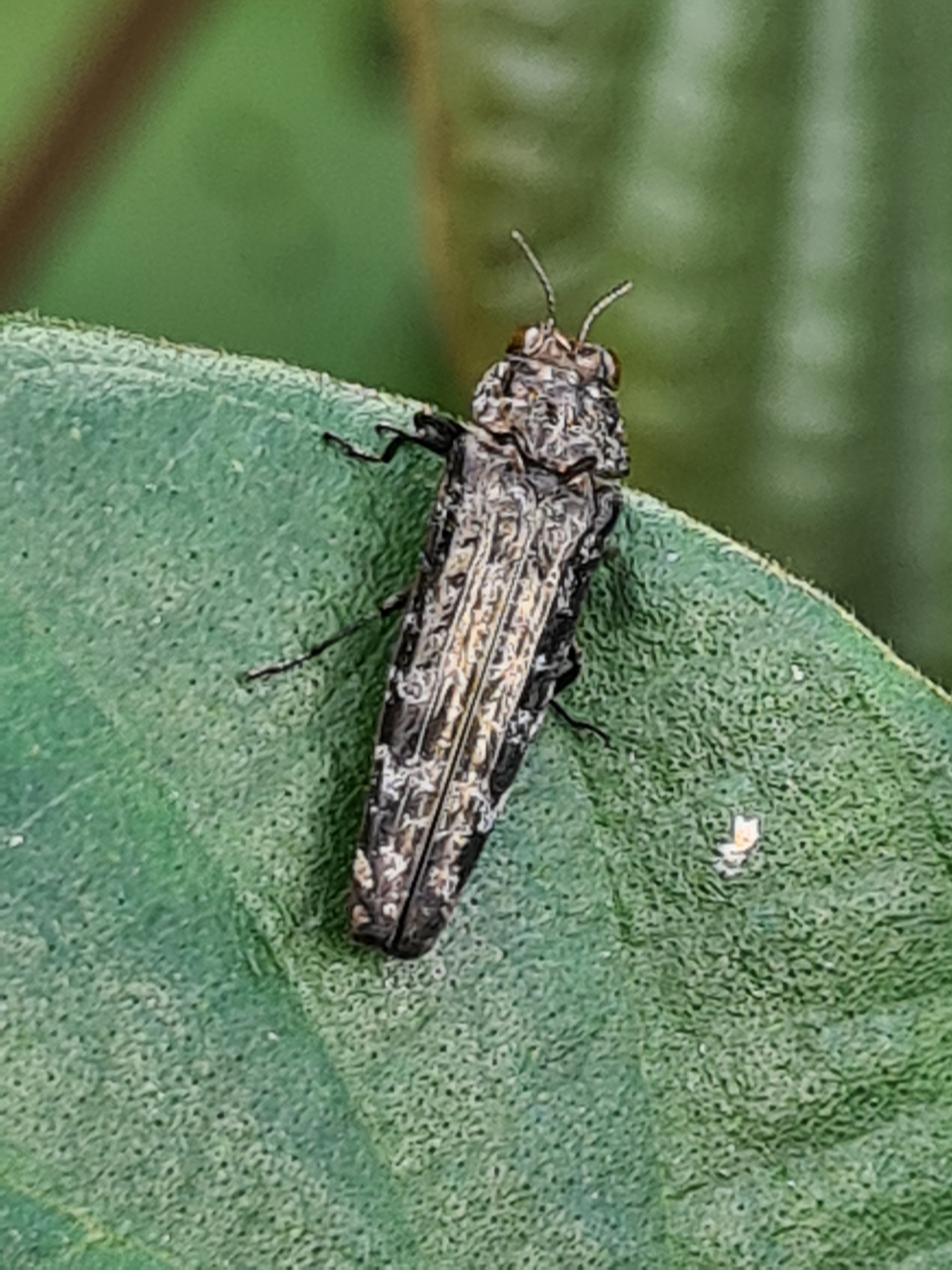

Scientific classification
- Kingdom: Animalia
- Phylum: Arthropoda
- Class: Insecta
- Order: Coleoptera
- Suborder: Polyphaga
- Infraorder: Elateriformia
- Family: Buprestidae
- Genus: Dismorpha
- Species: D. linearis

Binomial name
- Dismorpha linearis (Linnaeus, 1758)

= Dismorpha linearis =

Species of beetle

Dismorpha linearis is a species of beetle from the genus Dismorpha.
