= Dismorpha =

Scientific classification
- Kingdom: Animalia
- Phylum: Arthropoda
- Class: Insecta
- Order: Coleoptera
- Suborder: Polyphaga
- Infraorder: Elateriformia
- Family: Buprestidae
- Tribe: Coraebini
- Genus: Dismorpha; Gistel, 1848

Genus of beetles

Dismorpha is a genus of beetles in the family Buprestidae, containing the following species:

- Dismorpha aequatoriana Cobos, 1990
- Dismorpha diffusa (Chevrolat, 1838)
- Dismorpha fossulata (Chevrolat, 1835)
- Dismorpha grandis Cobos, 1990
- Dismorpha irrorata (Gory & Laporte, 1839)
- Dismorpha juvenca (Gory, 1841)
- Dismorpha linearis (Linnaeus, 1758)
- Dismorpha marmorea (Kerremans, 1897)
- Dismorpha morosa (Chevrolat, 1835)
- Dismorpha plana (Fabricius, 1798)
- Dismorpha tenuis (Kirsch, 1873)
