= Neomegaderus stigma =

Scientific classification
- Kingdom: Animalia
- Phylum: Arthropoda
- Class: Insecta
- Order: Coleoptera
- Suborder: Polyphaga
- Infraorder: Cucujiformia
- Family: Cerambycidae
- Genus: Neomegaderus
- Species: N. stigma

Binomial name
- Neomegaderus stigma (Linnaeus, 1758)

Species of beetle

Neomegaderus stigma is a species of beetle in the family Cerambycidae. It was described by Carl Linnaeus in his landmark 1758 10th edition of Systema Naturae.
