= Neomegaderus bifasciatus =

Scientific classification
- Kingdom: Animalia
- Phylum: Arthropoda
- Class: Insecta
- Order: Coleoptera
- Suborder: Polyphaga
- Infraorder: Cucujiformia
- Family: Cerambycidae
- Genus: Neomegaderus
- Species: N. bifasciatus

Binomial name
- Neomegaderus bifasciatus (Dupont, 1836)

Species of beetle

Neomegaderus bifasciatus is a species of beetle in the family Cerambycidae. It was described by Dupont in 1836.
