= Neomegaderus =

Scientific classification
- Kingdom: Animalia
- Phylum: Arthropoda
- Class: Insecta
- Order: Coleoptera
- Suborder: Polyphaga
- Infraorder: Cucujiformia
- Family: Cerambycidae
- Tribe: Trachyderini
- Genus: Neomegaderus

Genus of beetles

Neomegaderus is a genus of beetles in the family Cerambycidae, containing the following species:

- Neomegaderus bifasciatus (Dupont, 1836)
- Neomegaderus stigma (Linnaeus, 1758)
