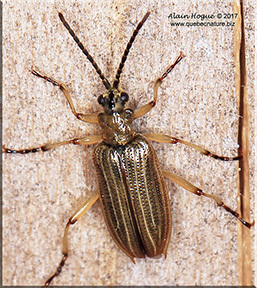

Scientific classification
- Kingdom: Animalia
- Phylum: Arthropoda
- Class: Insecta
- Order: Coleoptera
- Suborder: Polyphaga
- Infraorder: Cucujiformia
- Family: Chrysomelidae
- Genus: Neohaemonia
- Species: N. melsheimeri

Binomial name
- Neohaemonia melsheimeri (Lacordaire, 1845)

= Neohaemonia melsheimeri =

Species of beetle

Neohaemonia melsheimeri is a species of aquatic leaf beetle in the family Chrysomelidae. It is found in North America.
