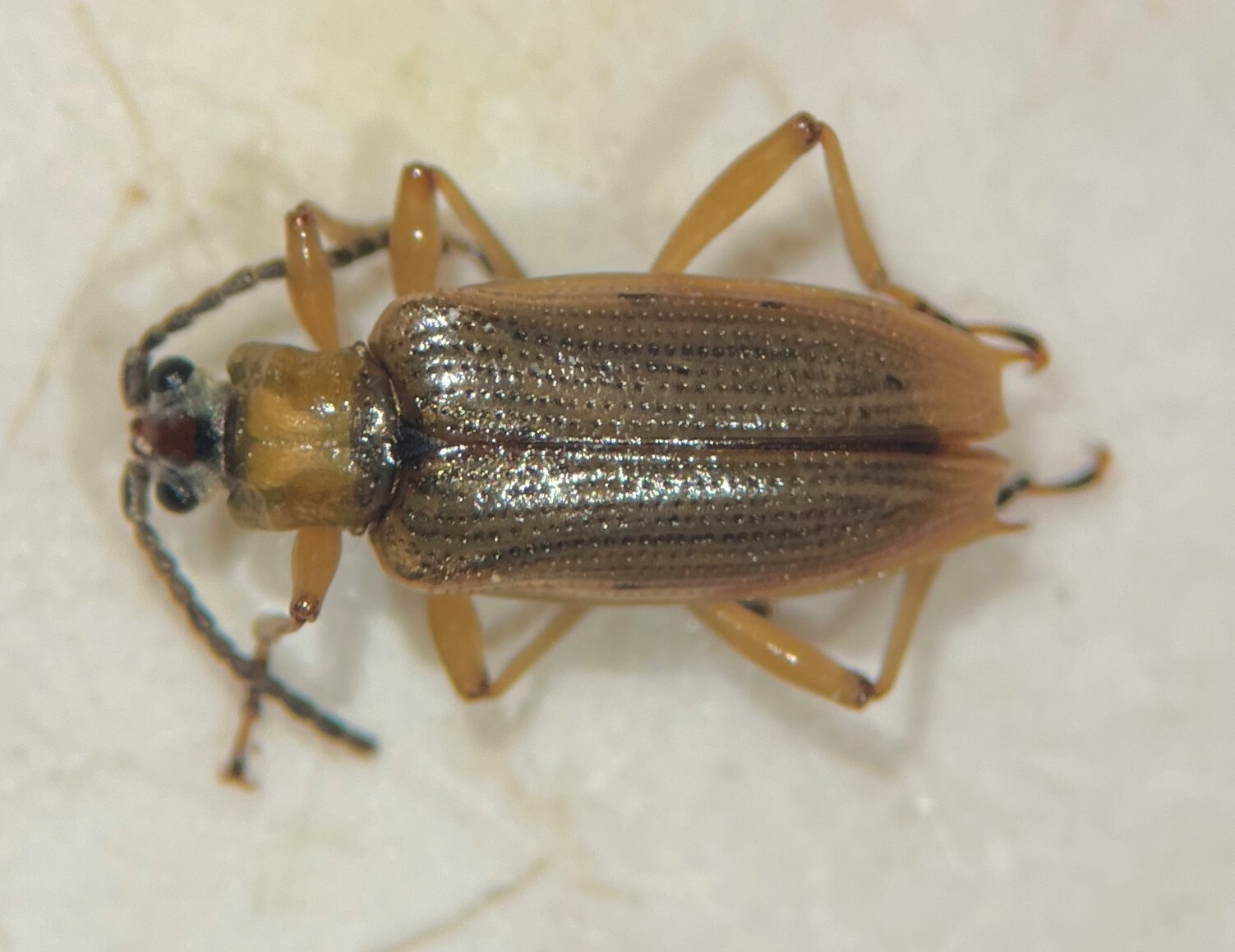
- Neohaemonia nigricornis

Scientific classification
- Kingdom: Animalia
- Phylum: Arthropoda
- Clade: Pancrustacea
- Class: Insecta
- Order: Coleoptera
- Suborder: Polyphaga
- Infraorder: Cucujiformia
- Family: Chrysomelidae
- Subfamily: Donaciinae
- Genus: Neohaemonia; Székessy, 1941

= Neohaemonia =

Genus of beetles

Neohaemonia is a genus of aquatic leaf beetles in the family Chrysomelidae. There are at least four described species in the genus Neohaemonia.

== Species ==
The following species are recognised in the genus Neohaemonia:

- Neohaemonia flagellata Askevold, 1988;
- Neohaemonia melsheimeri (Lacordaire, 1845);
- Neohaemonia minnesotensis Askevold, 1988;
- Neohaemonia nigricornis (Kirby, 1837).
