= Neohaemonia minnesotensis =

Scientific classification
- Kingdom: Animalia
- Phylum: Arthropoda
- Class: Insecta
- Order: Coleoptera
- Suborder: Polyphaga
- Infraorder: Cucujiformia
- Family: Chrysomelidae
- Genus: Neohaemonia
- Species: N. minnesotensis

Binomial name
- Neohaemonia minnesotensis Askevold, 1988

Species of beetle

Neohaemonia minnesotensis is a species of aquatic leaf beetles in the family Chrysomelidae. It is found in North America.
