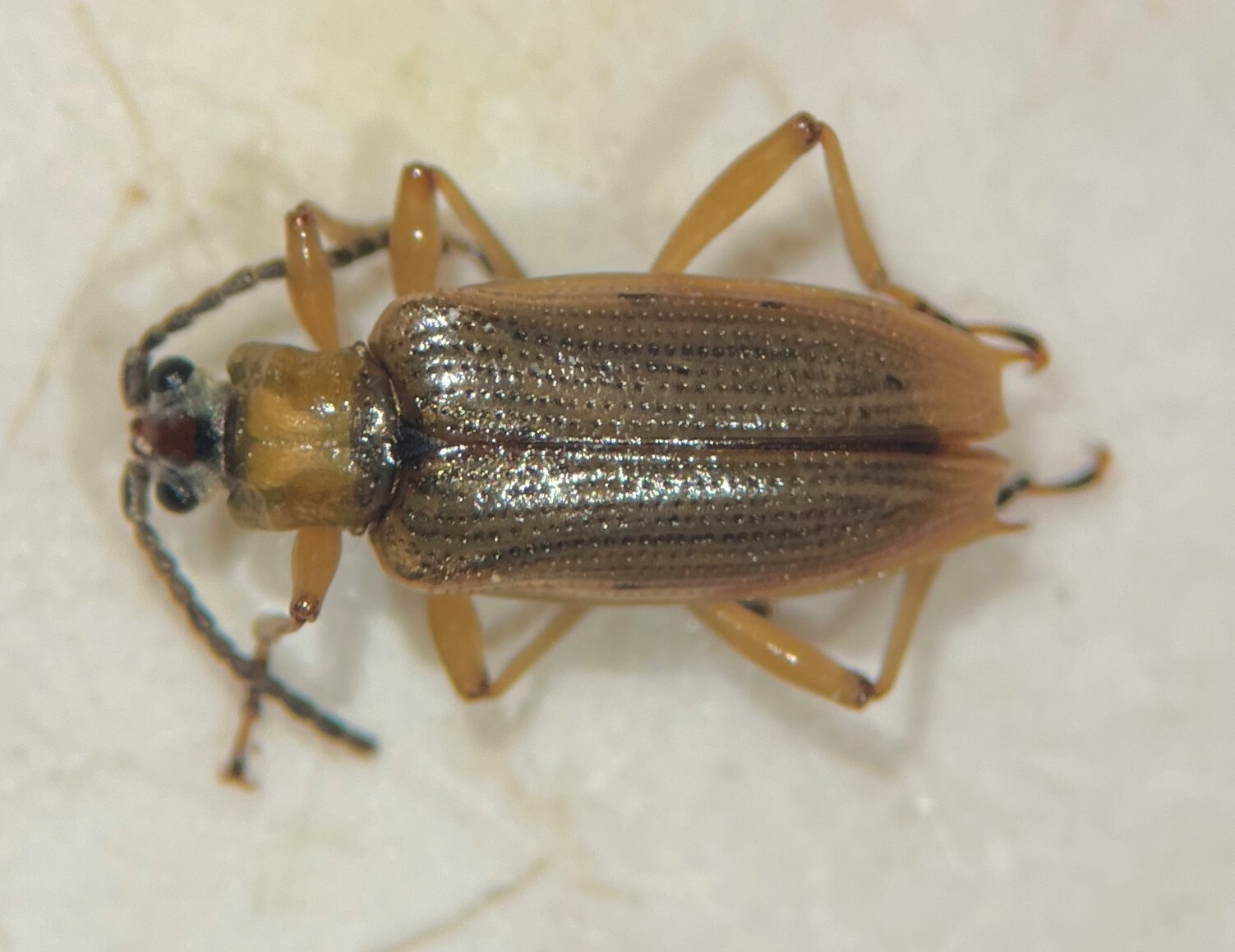

Scientific classification
- Kingdom: Animalia
- Phylum: Arthropoda
- Class: Insecta
- Order: Coleoptera
- Suborder: Polyphaga
- Infraorder: Cucujiformia
- Family: Chrysomelidae
- Genus: Neohaemonia
- Species: N. nigricornis

Binomial name
- Neohaemonia nigricornis (Kirby, 1837)

Synonyms
- Haemonia nigricornis Kirby, 1837

= Neohaemonia nigricornis =

Species of beetle

Neohaemonia nigricornis is a species of aquatic leaf beetle in the family Chrysomelidae found in North America. Its range includes the northern United States and southern Canada.
