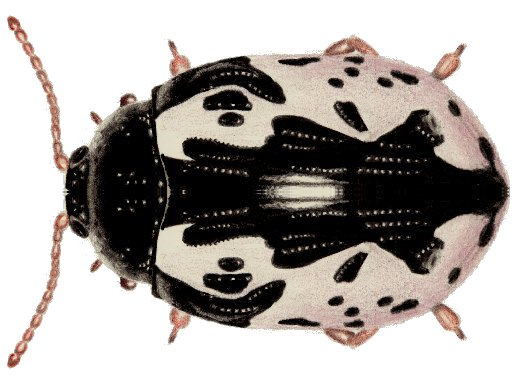

Scientific classification
- Kingdom: Animalia
- Phylum: Arthropoda
- Clade: Pancrustacea
- Class: Insecta
- Order: Coleoptera
- Suborder: Polyphaga
- Infraorder: Cucujiformia
- Family: Chrysomelidae
- Genus: Calligrapha
- Species: C. scalaris

Binomial name
- Calligrapha scalaris (J. E. LeConte, 1824)

= Calligrapha scalaris =

Species of beetle

Calligrapha scalaris, the elm calligrapha, is a species of leaf beetle in the family Chrysomelidae. It is found in North America.

== Subspecies ==
These two subspecies belong to the species Calligrapha scalaris:

- Calligrapha scalaris floridana Schaeffer
- Calligrapha scalaris scalaris
