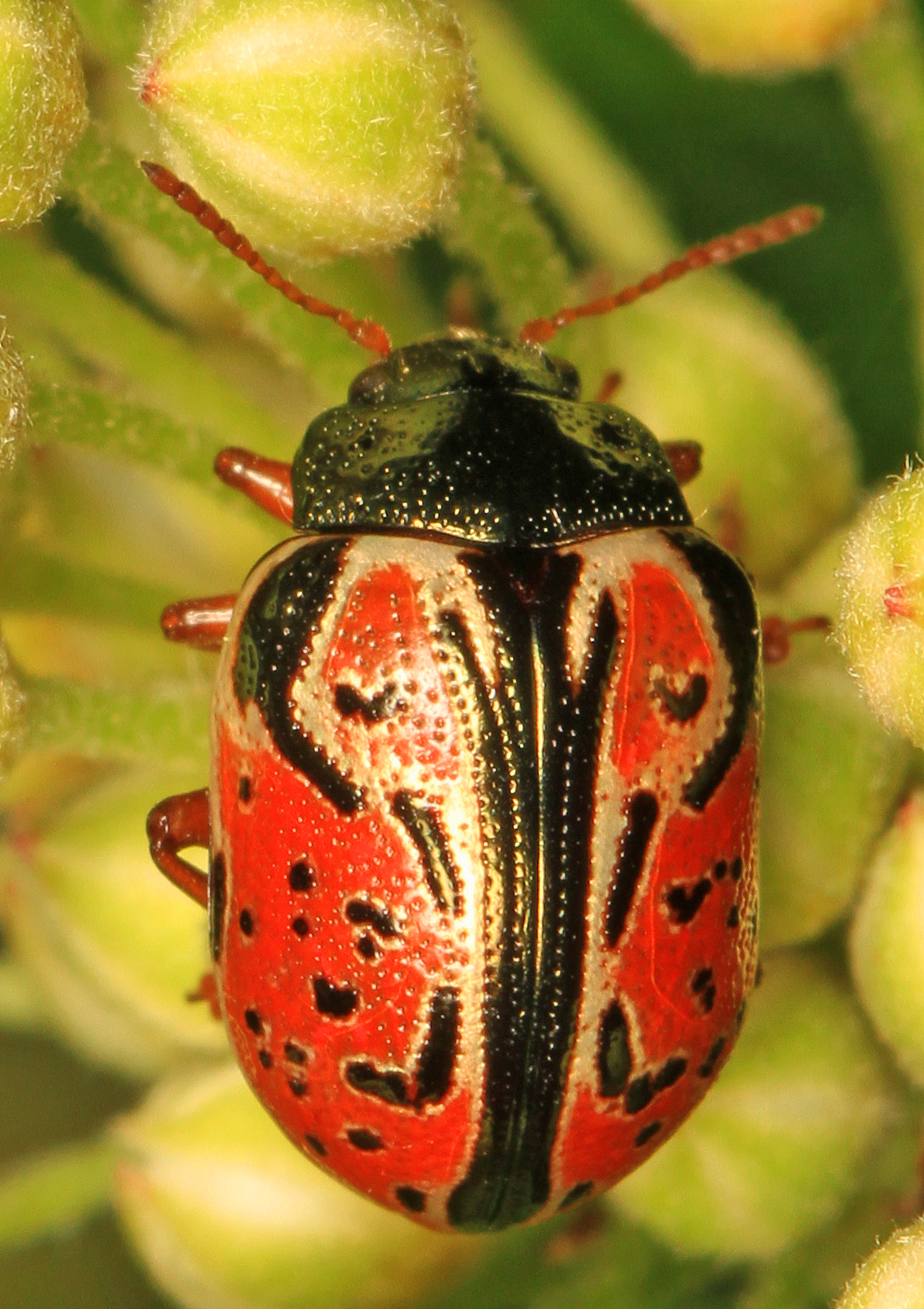
- Calligrapha spiraeae

Scientific classification
- Kingdom: Animalia
- Phylum: Arthropoda
- Clade: Pancrustacea
- Class: Insecta
- Order: Coleoptera
- Suborder: Polyphaga
- Infraorder: Cucujiformia
- Family: Chrysomelidae
- Subfamily: Chrysomelinae
- Tribe: Chrysomelini
- Genus: Calligrapha; Chevrolat, 1836

Type species
- Chrysomela polyspila Germar, 1821

Subgenera
- Bidensomela; Calligramma; Calligrapha; Erythrographa; Graphicallo; Zygogramma

Synonyms
- sensu stricto: Polyspila Hope, 1840; Phyllis Gistel, 1848; Boliographa Motschulsky, 1860; Metallographa Motschulsky, 1860; Bidensomela: Acalligrapha Monrós, 1955; Coreopsomela Monrós, 1955; Zygogramma: Zygospila Achard, 1923

= Calligrapha =

Genus of beetles

Calligrapha is a large genus of American Chrysomelinae (a subfamily of leaf beetles), with over 100 species occurring from North America through Central America.

== Biology ==
Some members of the subgenus Zygogramma are agricultural pests, while others are used as biological control agents. Calligrapha exclamationis is a pest species of sunflower crops in North America. At least two species have also been used as a form of biological pest control: Calligrapha bicolorata was introduced to India as a biocontrol agent for the weed Parthenium hysterophorus, and Calligrapha suturalis was introduced to Russia as a control for Ambrosia artemisiifolia (common ragweed).

== Selected species ==
=== Subgenus Calligrapha (Bidensomela) Monrós, 1955 ===
- Calligrapha androwi S. Clark & Cavey, 1995
- Calligrapha bidenticola Brown, 1945
- Calligrapha californica Linell, 1896
- Calligrapha incisa (Rogers, 1856)
- Calligrapha praecelsis (Rogers, 1856)

=== Subgenus Calligrapha (Calligramma) Monrós, 1955 ===
- Calligrapha cephalanthi (Schwarz, 1878)

=== Subgenus Calligrapha (Calligrapha) Chevrolat, 1836 ===
- Calligrapha aeneopicta Stål, 1859
- Calligrapha alni Schaeffer, 1928
- Calligrapha alnicola Brown, 1945
- Calligrapha amator Brown, 1945
- Calligrapha amelia Knab, 1909
- Calligrapha anabelae Gómez-Zurita, 2015
- Calligrapha ancoralis Stal, 1860
- Calligrapha apicalis Notman, 1919
- Calligrapha argus Stål, 1859
- Calligrapha barda (Say, 1835)
- Calligrapha billbergi Stål, 1860
- Calligrapha catarinae Gómez-Zurita, 2015
- Calligrapha confluens Schaeffer, 1928
- Calligrapha consputa Stål, 1860
- Calligrapha discrepans (Achard, 1923)
- Calligrapha dislocata (Rogers, 1856)
- Calligrapha diversa Stal, 1859
- Calligrapha dolosa Brown, 1945
- Calligrapha elegantula Jacoby, 1877
- Calligrapha eupatris Stål, 1860
- Calligrapha felina Stål, 1860
- Calligrapha floridana Schaeffer, 1934
- Calligrapha fulvipes (Gistel, 1848)
- Calligrapha geographica Stål, 1860
- Calligrapha ignota Brown, 1940
- Calligrapha knabi Brown, 1940
- Calligrapha matronalis Erichson, 1847
- Calligrapha mexicana Stål, 1859
- Calligrapha multiguttata Stål, 1859
- Calligrapha multiplagata (Achard, 1923)
- Calligrapha multipunctata (Say, 1824)
- Calligrapha multipustulata Stål, 1859
- Calligrapha ostryae Brown, 1945
- Calligrapha pantherina Stål, 1859
- Calligrapha panzoensis Bechyné, 1952
- Calligrapha pavimentata Gómez-Zurita, 2016
- Calligrapha philadelphica (Linnaeus, 1758)
- Calligrapha pnirsa Stål, 1860
- Calligrapha polyspila (Germar, 1821)
- Calligrapha pruni Brown, 1945
- Calligrapha rhoda Knab, 1909
- Calligrapha ramulifera Stål, 1859
- Calligrapha rowena Knab, 1909
- Calligrapha sallei (Achard, 1923)
- Calligrapha scalaris (J.E. LeConte, 1824)
- Calligrapha serpens Bowditch, 1911
- Calligrapha serpentina (Rogers, 1856)
- Calligrapha sigmoidea (J.L. LeConte, 1859)
- Calligrapha simillima Stål, 1860
- Calligrapha spiraeae (Say, 1826)
- Calligrapha stillatipennis Stål, 1859
- Calligrapha suturella Schaeffer, 1933
- Calligrapha sylvia (Stål, 1860)
- Calligrapha tiliae Brown, 1945
- Calligrapha verrucosa (Suffrian, 1858)
- Calligrapha vicina Schaeffer, 1933
- Calligrapha vigintimaculata (Chevrolat, 1833)
- Calligrapha virginea Brown, 1945
- Calligrapha zapoteca Gómez-Zurita, 2016

=== Subgenus Calligrapha (Erythrographa) Gómez-Zurita, 2018 ===
- Calligrapha aladina Bechyné, 1954
- Calligrapha femorata Jacoby, 1891
- Calligrapha gyllenhali Stål, 1859
- Calligrapha intermedia Jacoby, 1882
- Calligrapha labyrinthica Stål, 1859
- Calligrapha limbaticollis Stål, 1859
- Calligrapha notatipennis Stål, 1859
- Calligrapha suboculata Stål, 1859
- Calligrapha suffriani Jacoby, 1882
- Calligrapha synthesys Gómez-Zurita, 2018
- Calligrapha thermalis Gómez-Zurita, 2013
- Calligrapha tortilis Stål, 1859
- Calligrapha wickhami Bowditch, 1911

=== Subgenus Calligrapha (Graphicallo) Gómez-Zurita, 2018 ===
- Calligrapha lunata (Fabricius, 1787)

=== Subgenus Calligrapha (Zygogramma) Chevrolat in Dejean, 1836 ===
- Calligrapha aeneovittata Stål, 1859
- Calligrapha amanda Stål, 1859
- Calligrapha arcuigera Stål, 1859
- Calligrapha arizonica (Schaeffer, 1906)
- Calligrapha bicolorata (Pallister, 1953)
- Calligrapha bigenea Stål, 1859
- Calligrapha championi (Jacoby, 1879)
- Calligrapha clathrata (Jacoby, 1882)
- Calligrapha clavareaui (Bowditch, 1911)
- Calligrapha conjuncta (Rogers, 1856)
- Calligrapha continua (J.L. LeConte, 1868)
- Calligrapha decempustulata (Jacoby, 1891)
- Calligrapha disrupta (Rogers, 1856)
- Calligrapha dulcis Stål, 1859
- Calligrapha durangoensis (Jacoby, 1891)
- Calligrapha elongatula (Achard, 1924)
- Calligrapha esperanza (Bechyné, 1952)
- Calligrapha estriata (Schaeffer, 1920)
- Calligrapha exclamationis (Fabricius, 1798)
- Calligrapha fulvitarsis Jacoby, 1891
- Calligrapha gracilis (Jacoby, 1882)
- Calligrapha guttaticollis Stål, 1859
- Calligrapha guttulosa Stål, 1859
- Calligrapha heterothecae (Linell, 1896)
- Calligrapha hypocrita (Jacoby, 1882)
- Calligrapha jaliscensis (Bechyné, 1952)
- Calligrapha lemur Stål, 1860
- Calligrapha lentiginosa Stål, 1860
- Calligrapha lepidula Stål, 1859
- Calligrapha maculicollis (Jacoby, 1891)
- Calligrapha magica Stål, 1859
- Calligrapha malvae (Stål, 1859)
- Calligrapha militaris (Jacoby, 1891)
- Calligrapha mniszechi Stål, 1860
- Calligrapha morbillosa Stål, 1860
- Calligrapha neomexicana (Clark, Douglas, & Cavan, 2024)
- Calligrapha nicaraguensis (Jacoby, 1882)
- Calligrapha obscurofasciata (Jacoby, 1891)
- Calligrapha opifera (Stål, 1860)
- Calligrapha ornata (Jacoby, 1882)
- Calligrapha pallida (Bland, 1864)
- Calligrapha piceicollis (Stål, 1859)
- Calligrapha popa Stål, 1860
- Calligrapha pustulosa Stål, 1860
- Calligrapha quenseli Stål, 1860
- Calligrapha quinquevirgata Stål. 1859
- Calligrapha signatipennis (Stål, 1859)
- Calligrapha stali (Jacoby, 1882)
- Calligrapha suturalis (Fabricius, 1775)
- Calligrapha thoracica (Jacoby, 1891)
- Calligrapha tortuosa (Rogers, 1856)
- Calligrapha tricolorata (Pallister, 1953)
- Calligrapha violaceomaculata Jacoby, 1878

== Gallery ==
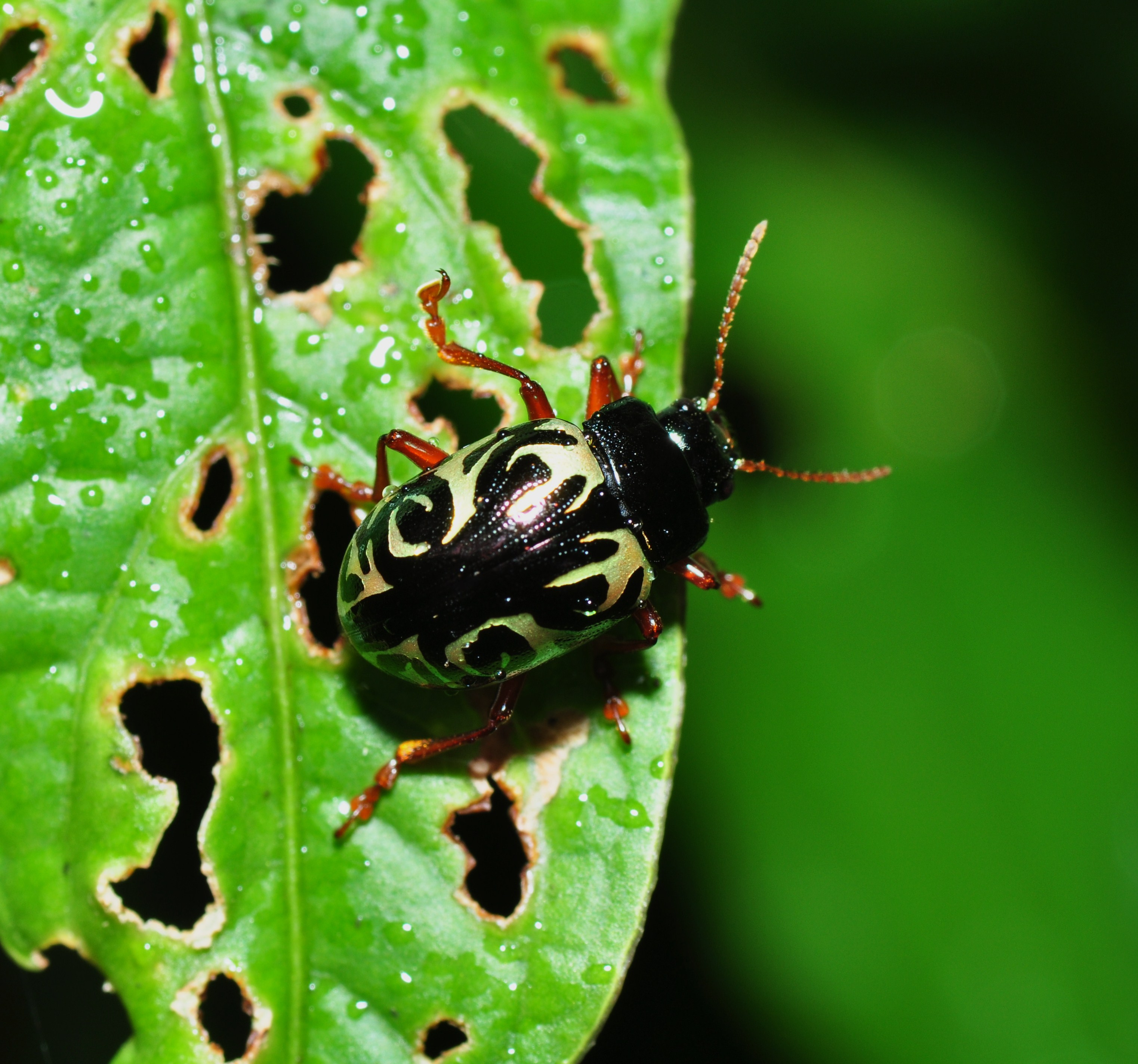
Calligrapha sp.

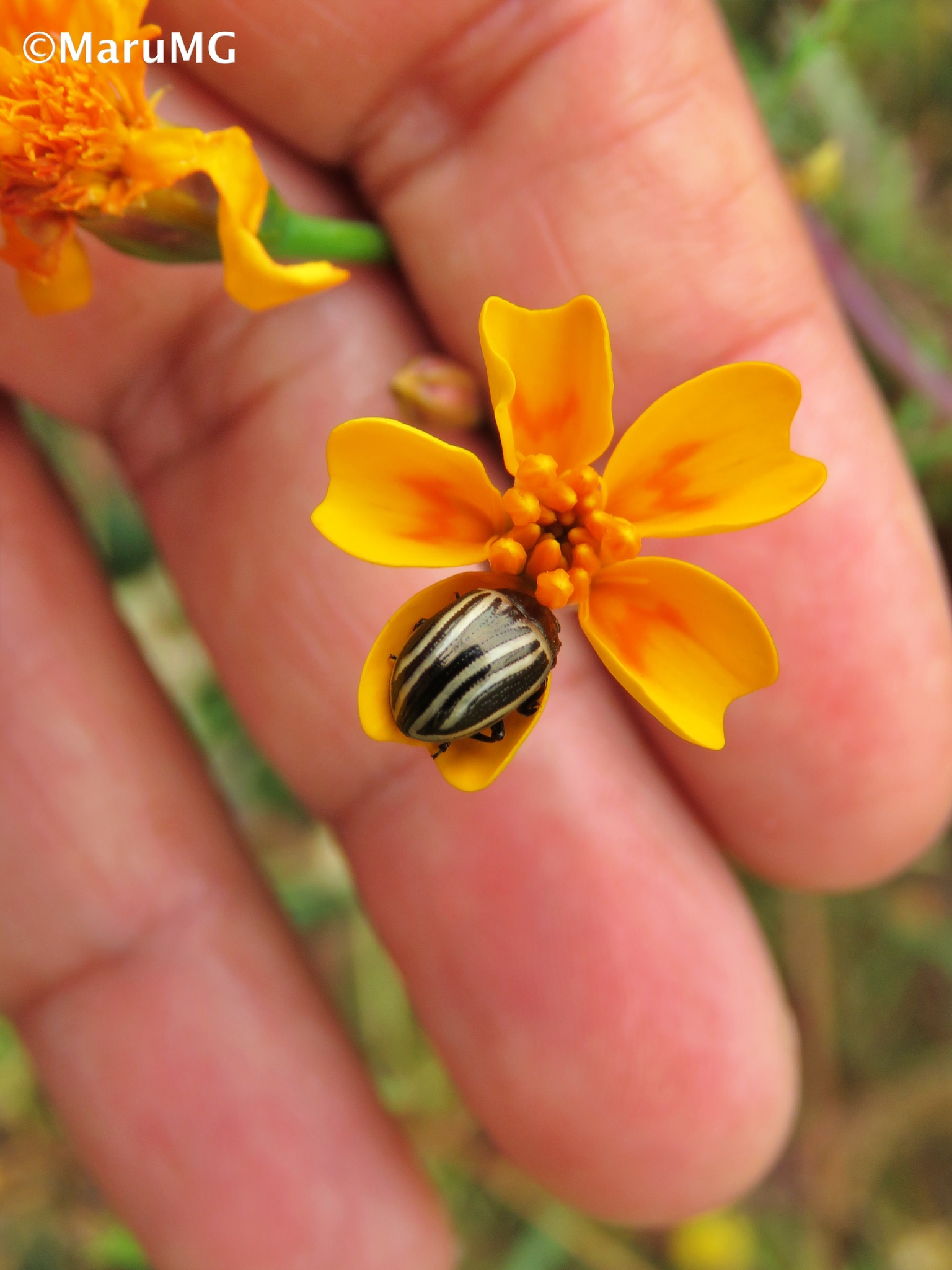
Calligrapha aeneovittata, México

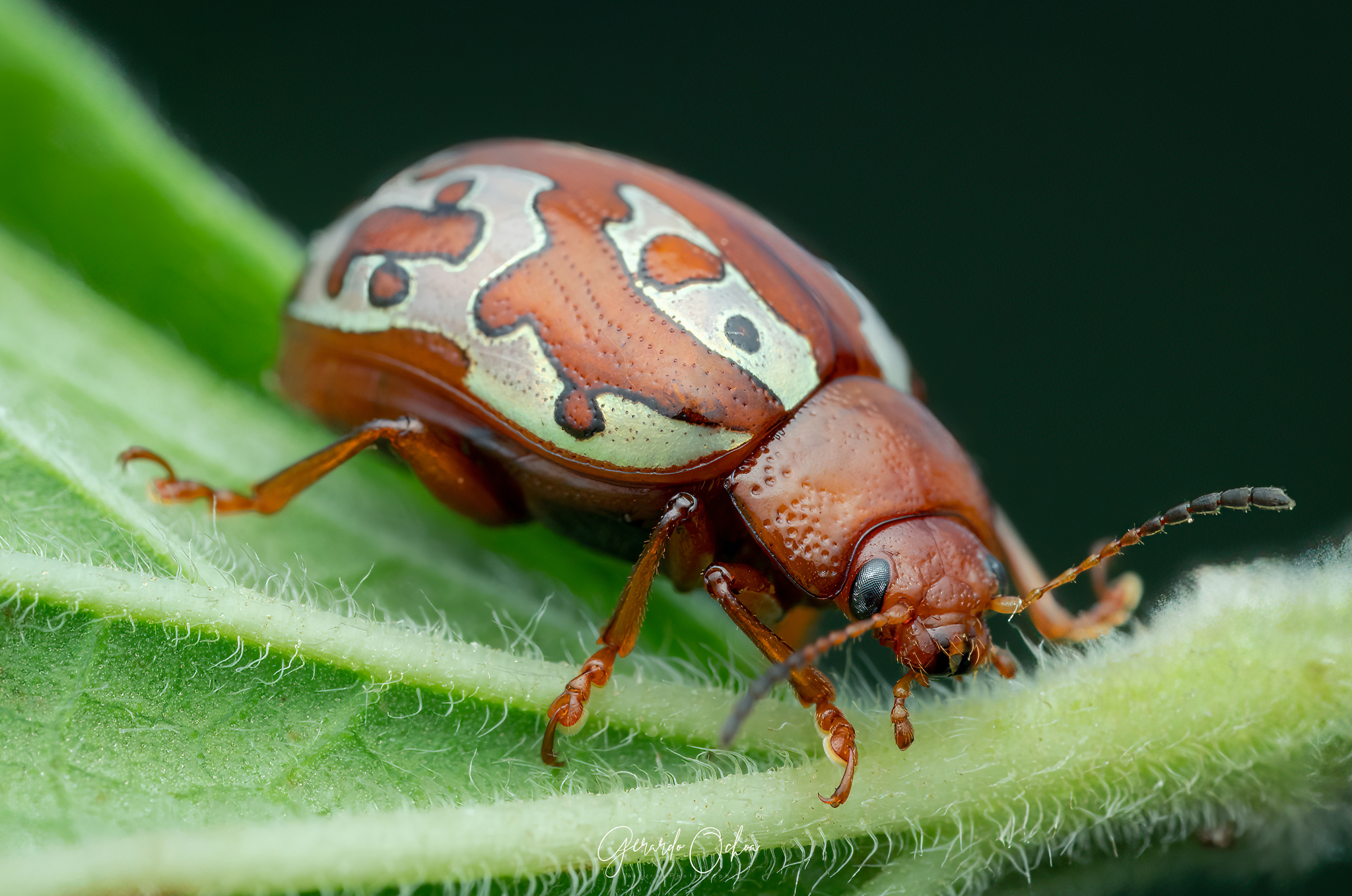
Calligrapha aladina, México

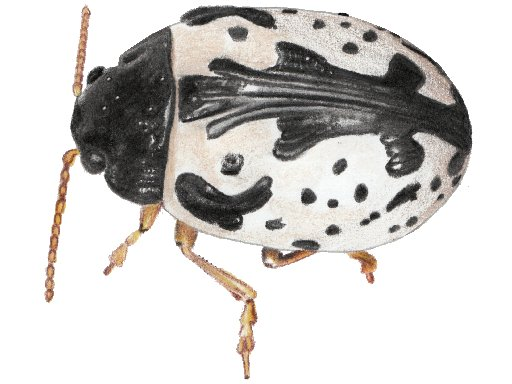
Calligrapha amator

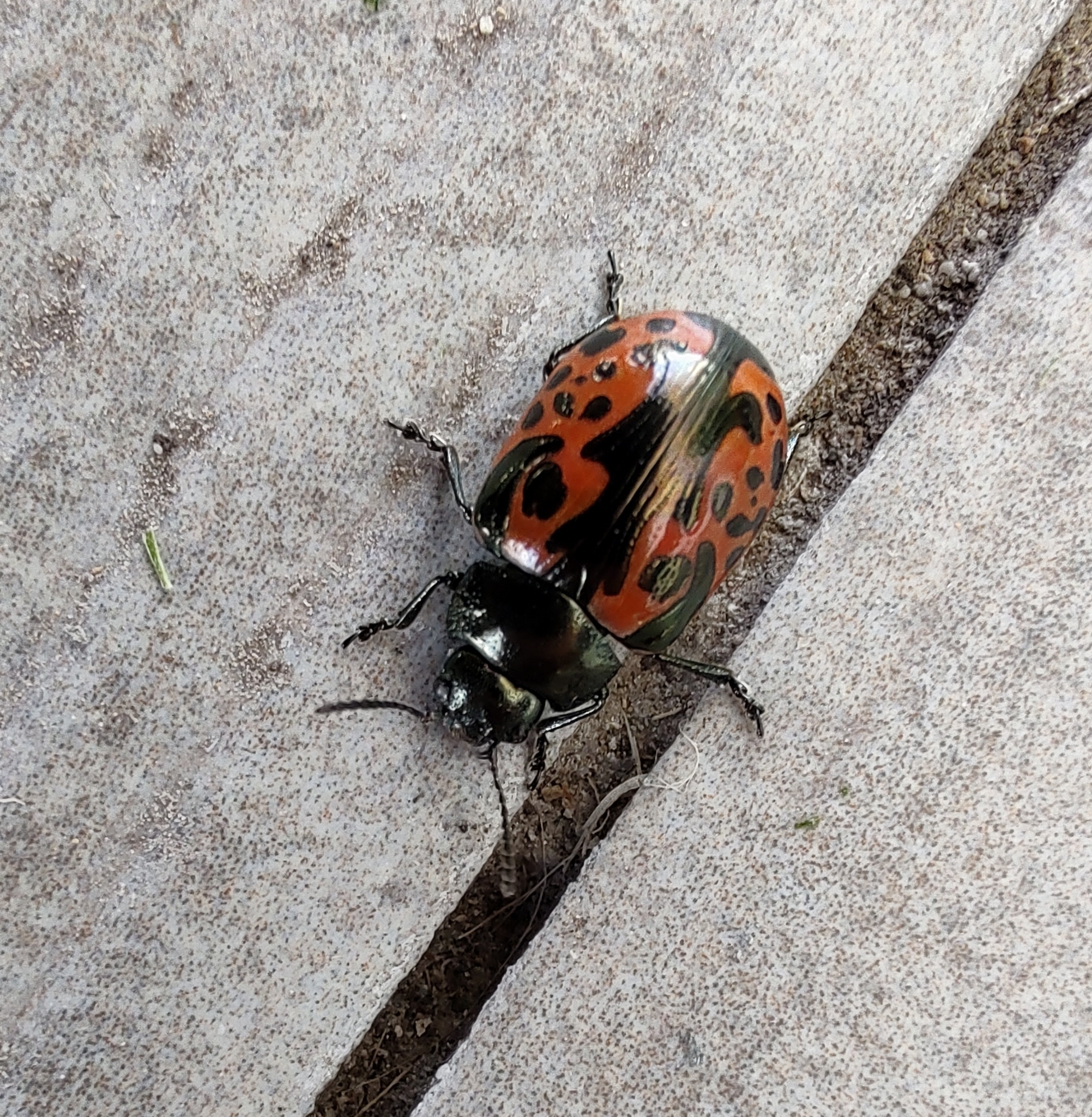
Calligrapha anabelae, México

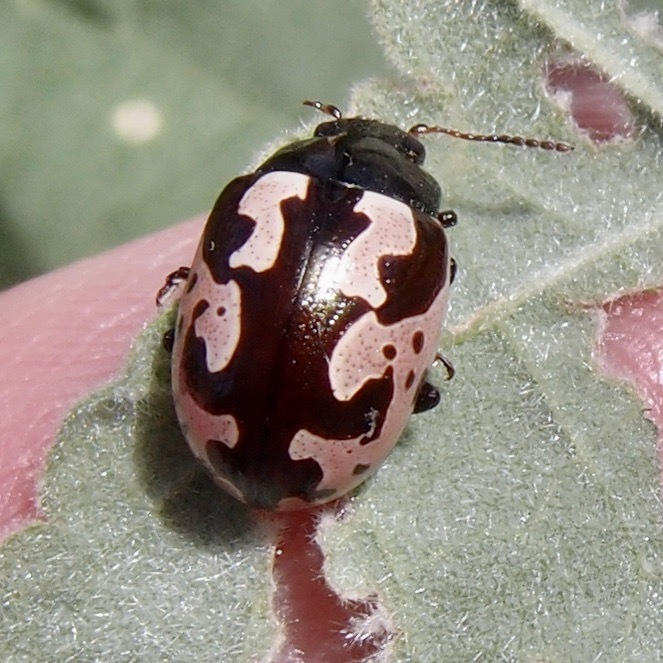
Calligrapha ancoralis, Arizona

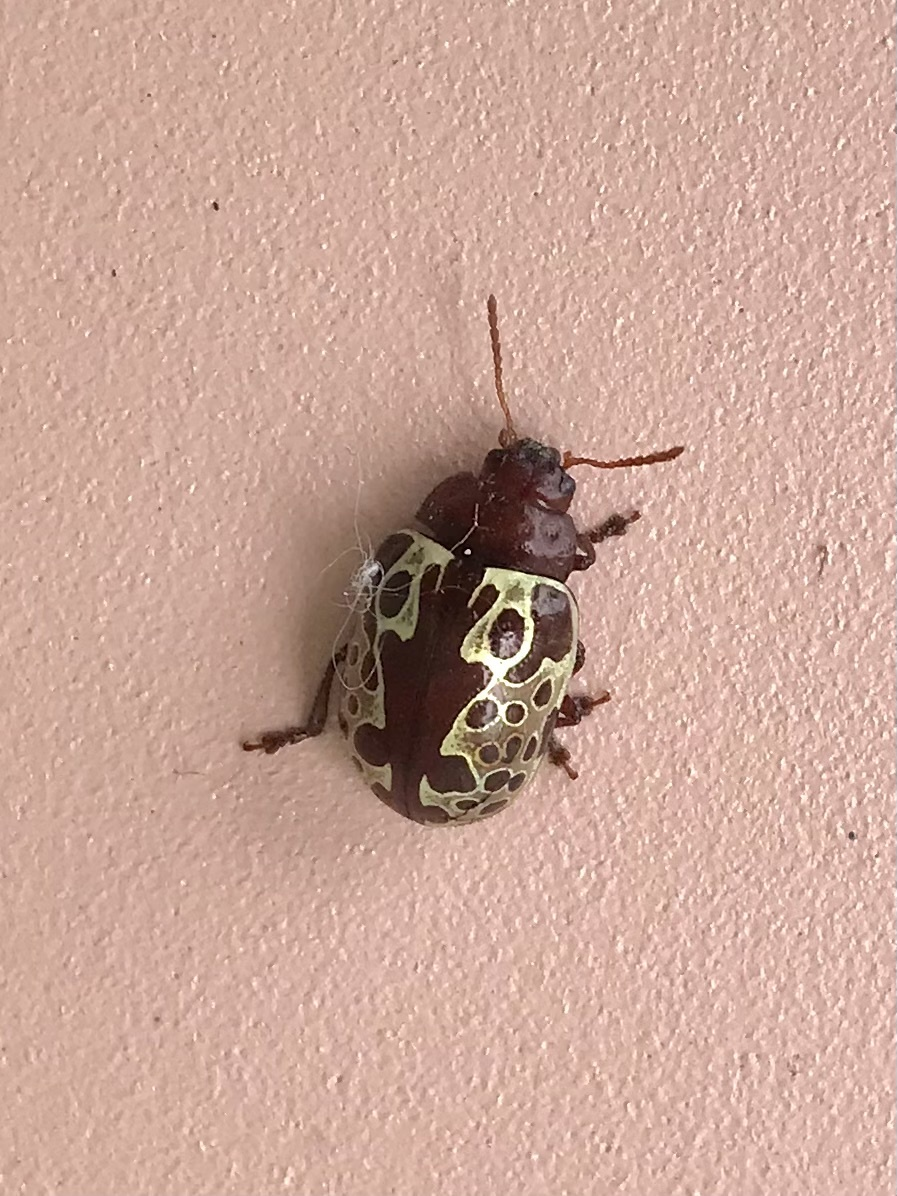
Calligrapha argus, Panamá

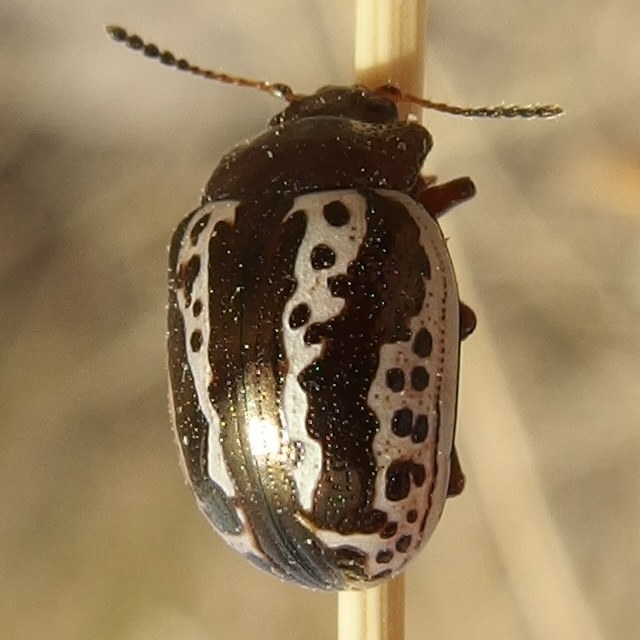
Calligrapha arizonica, Arizona

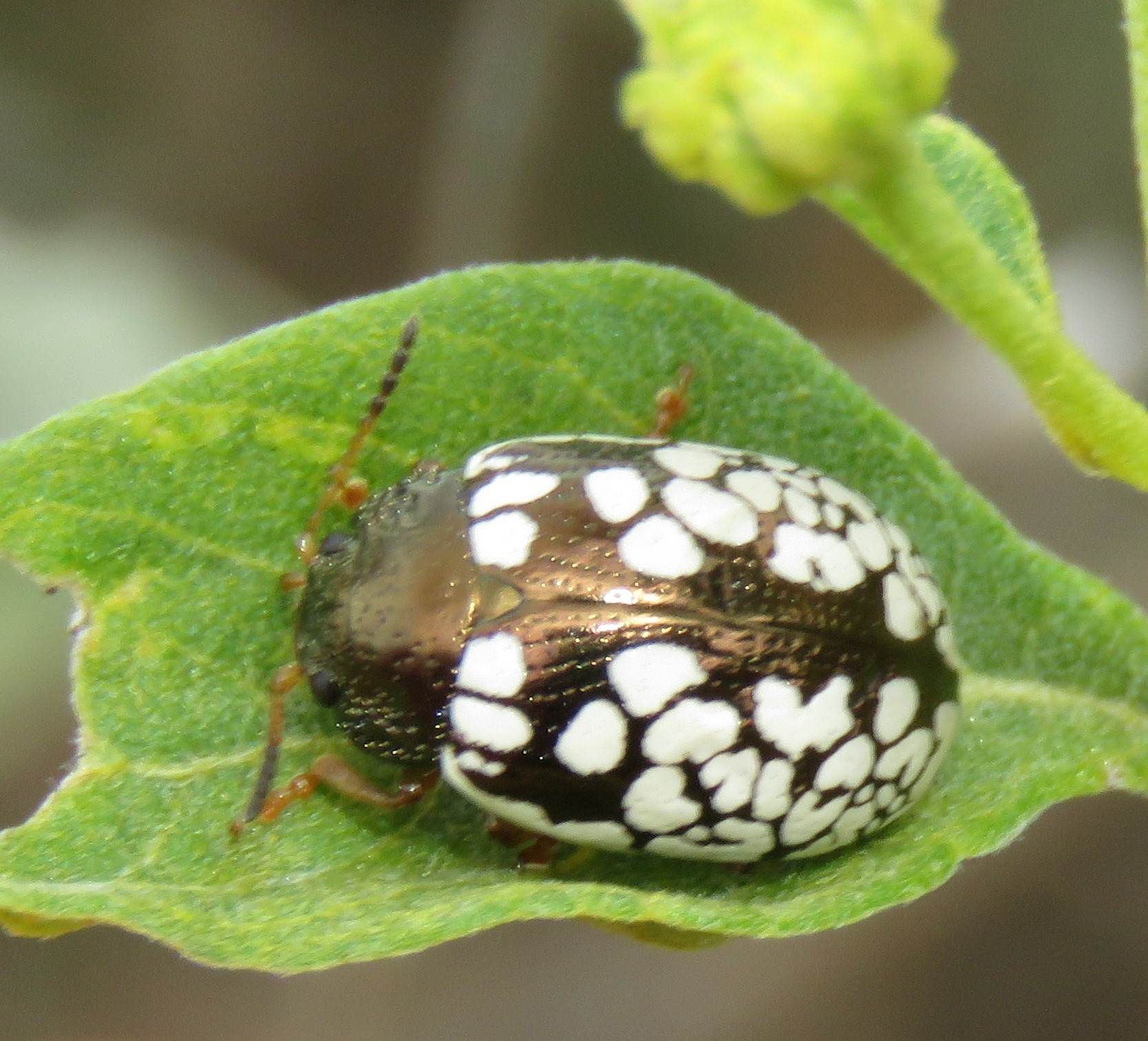
Calligrapha barda, México

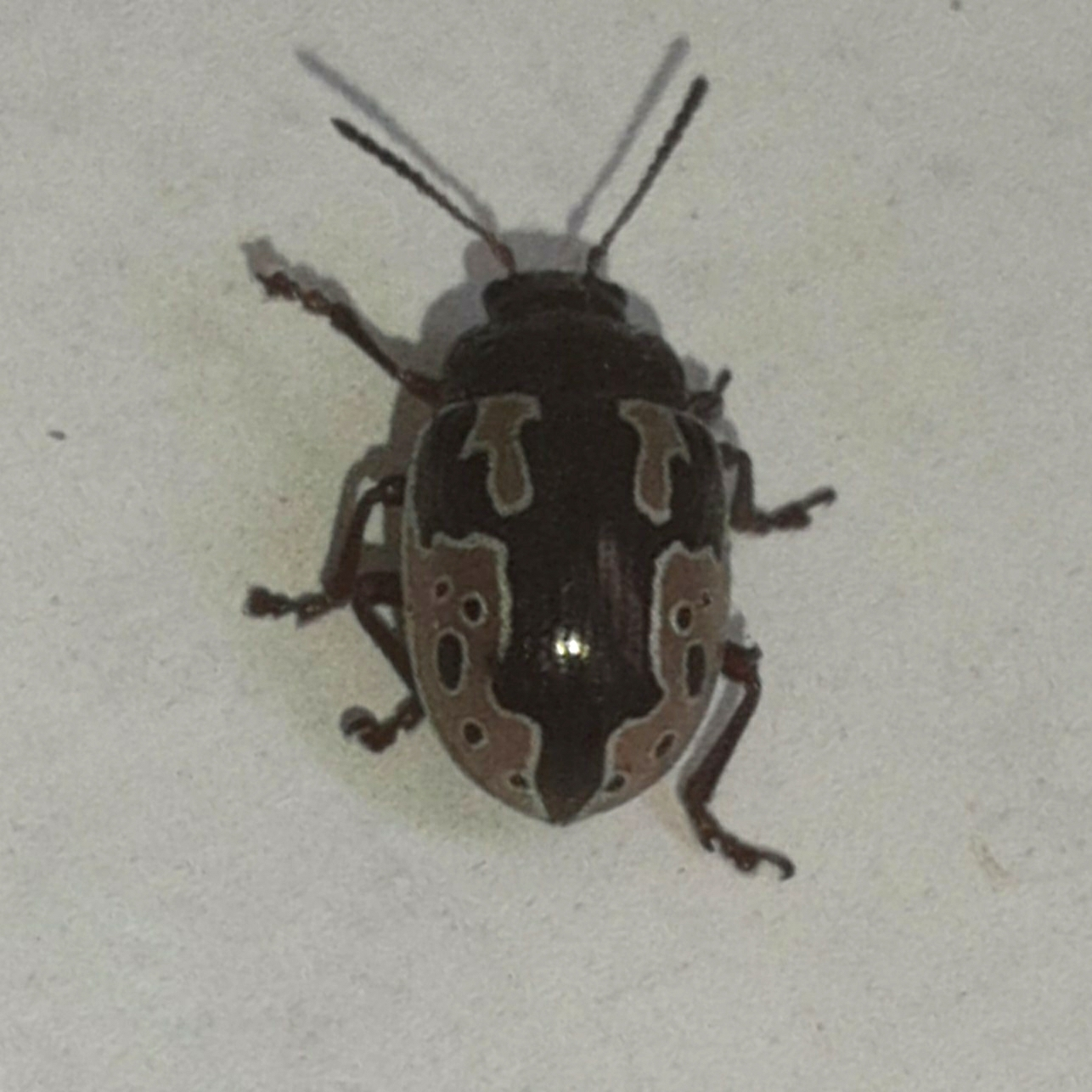
Calligrapha bigenera, Costa Rica

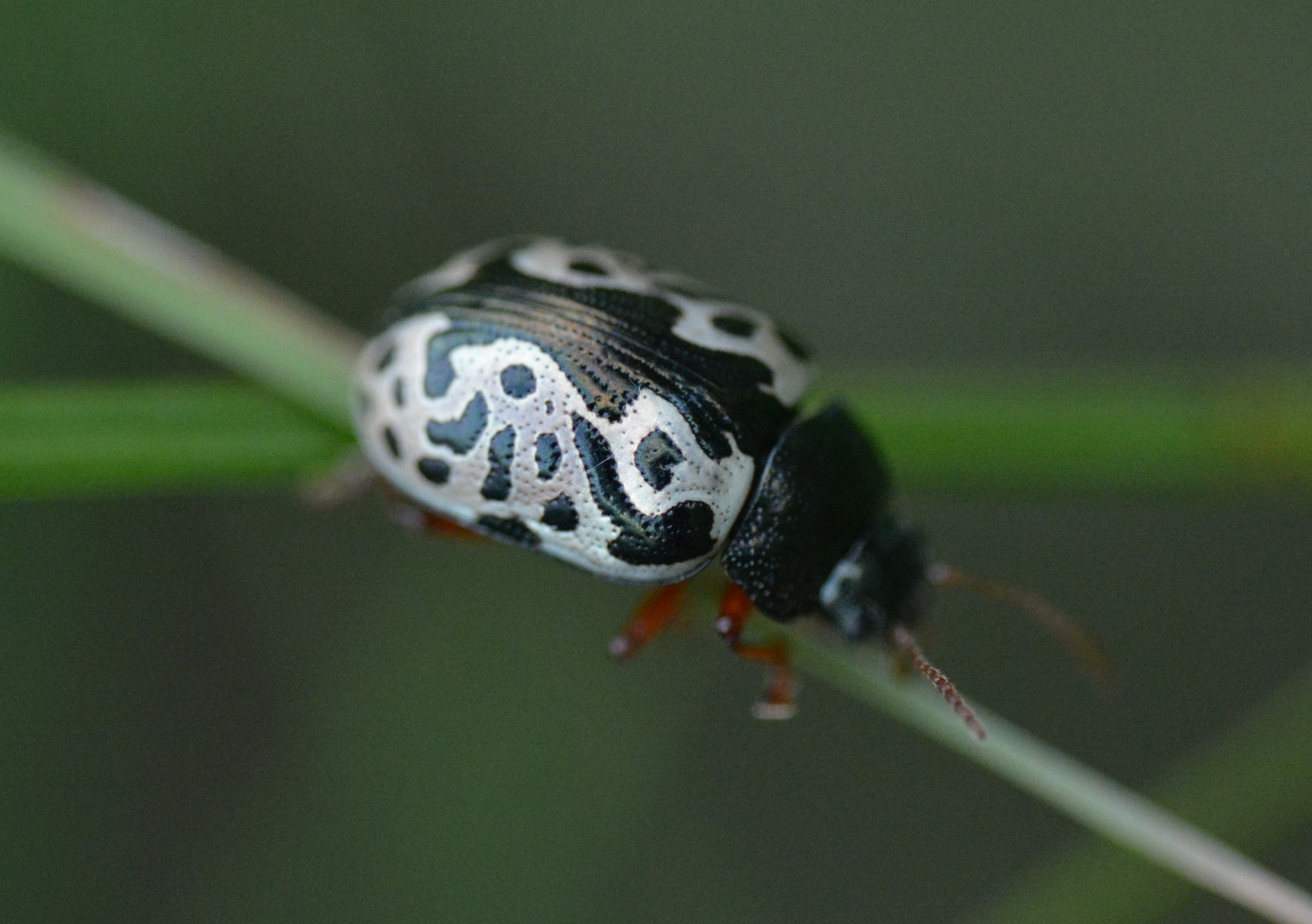
Calligrapha confluens, Canada

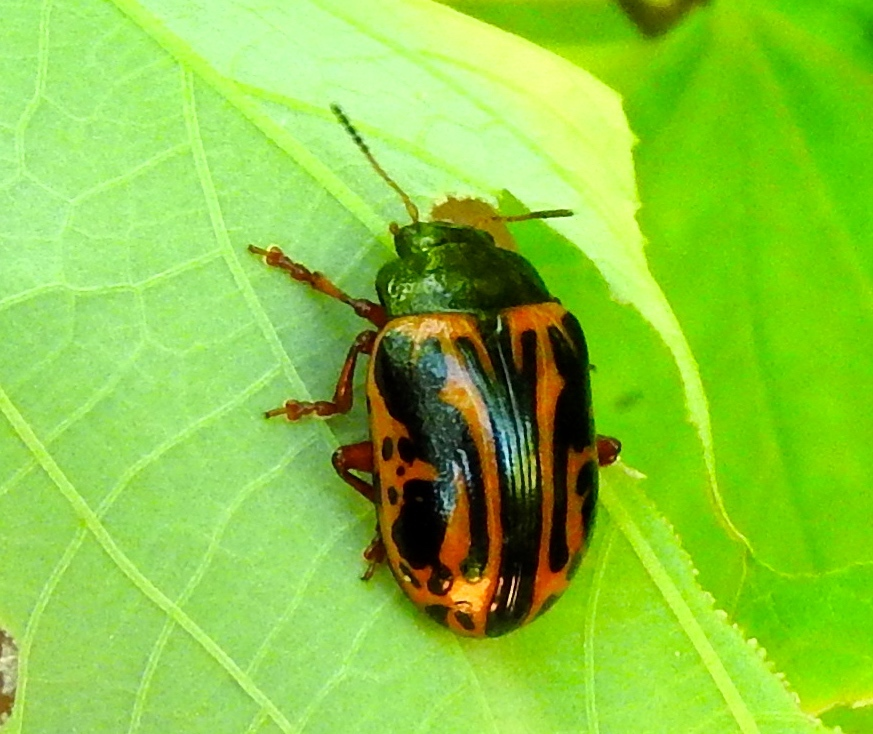
Calligrapha discrepans, México

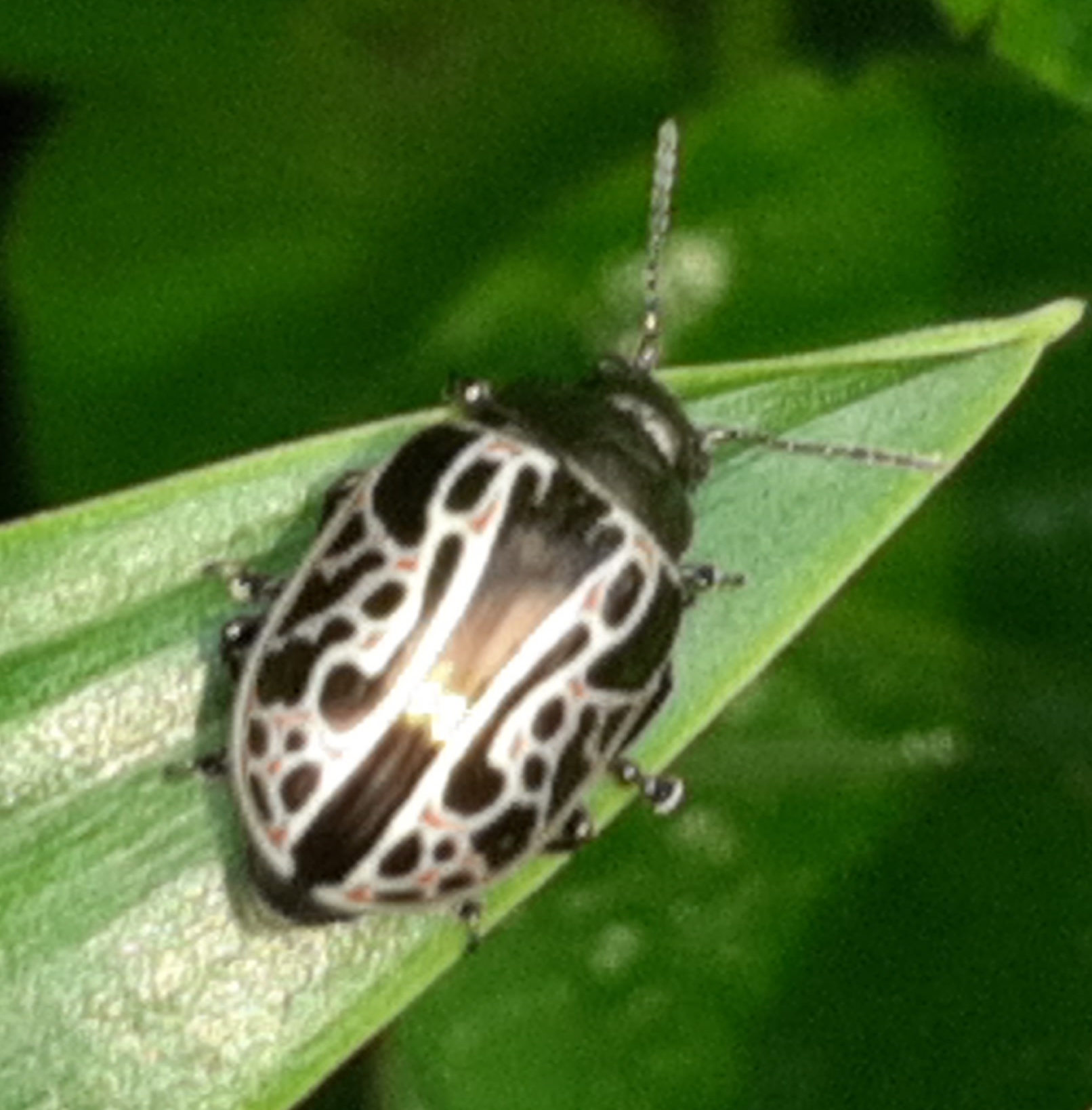
Calligrapha elegantula, Costa Rica

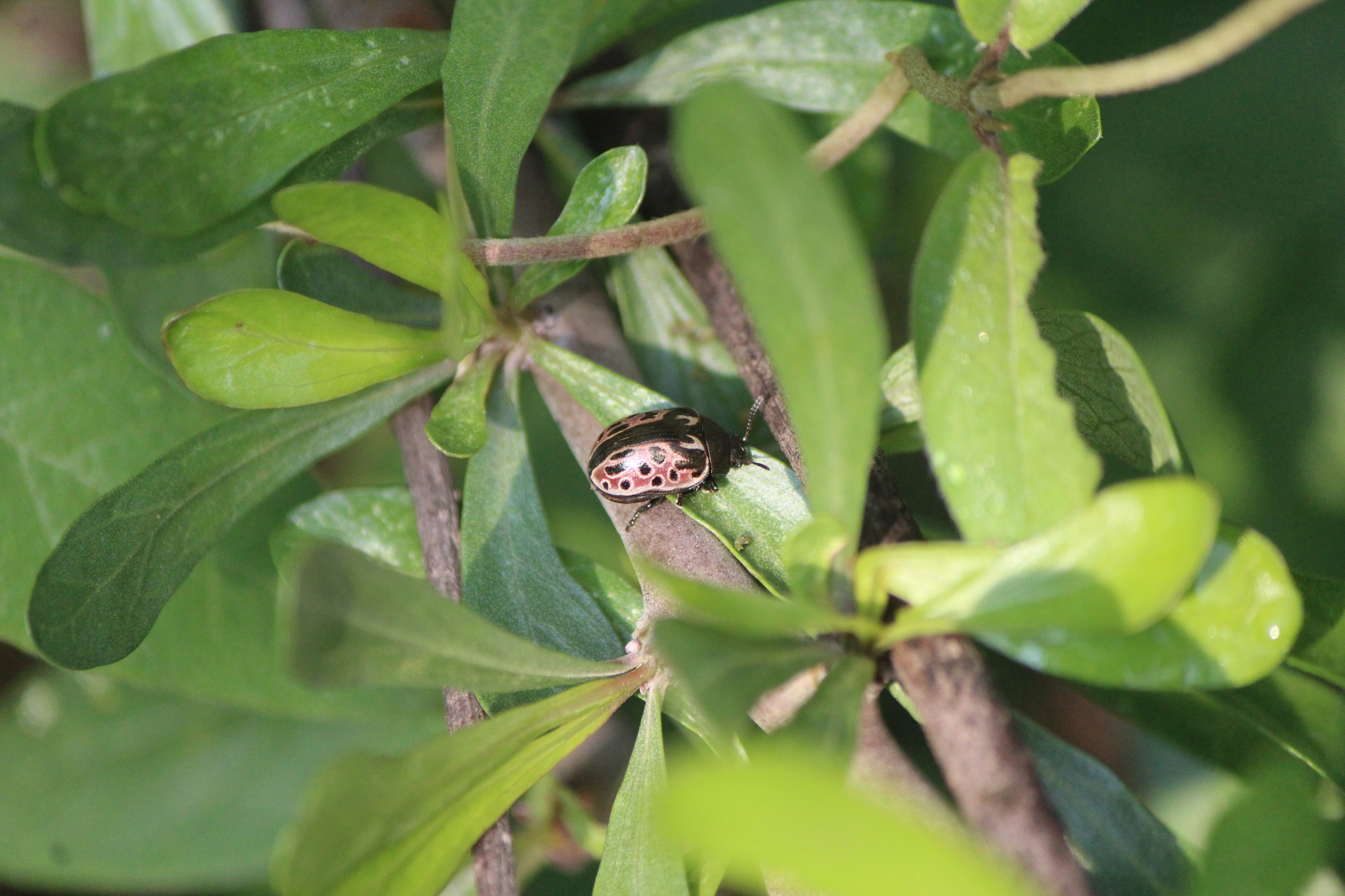
Calligrapha eupatris, México

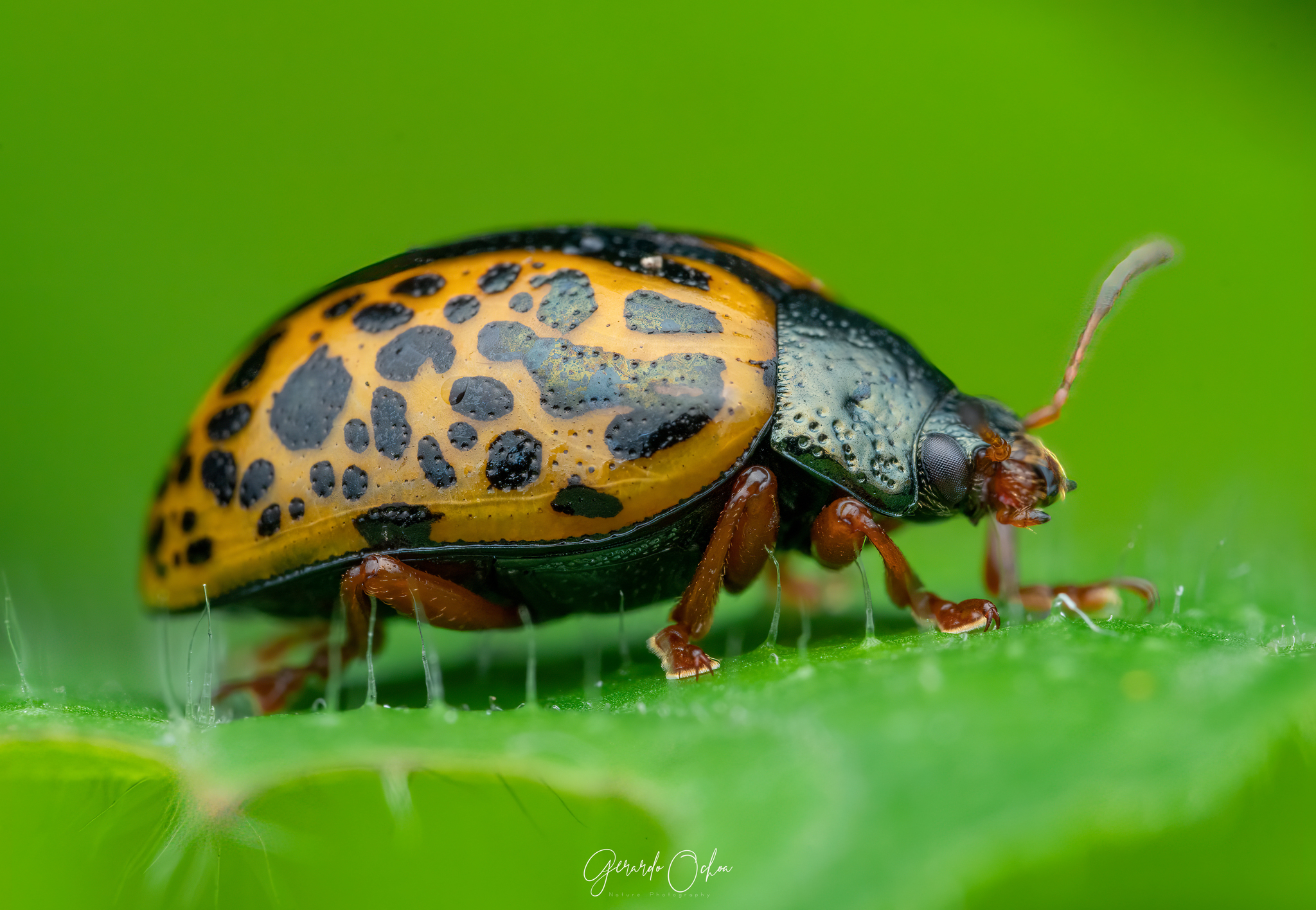
Calligrapha felina, México

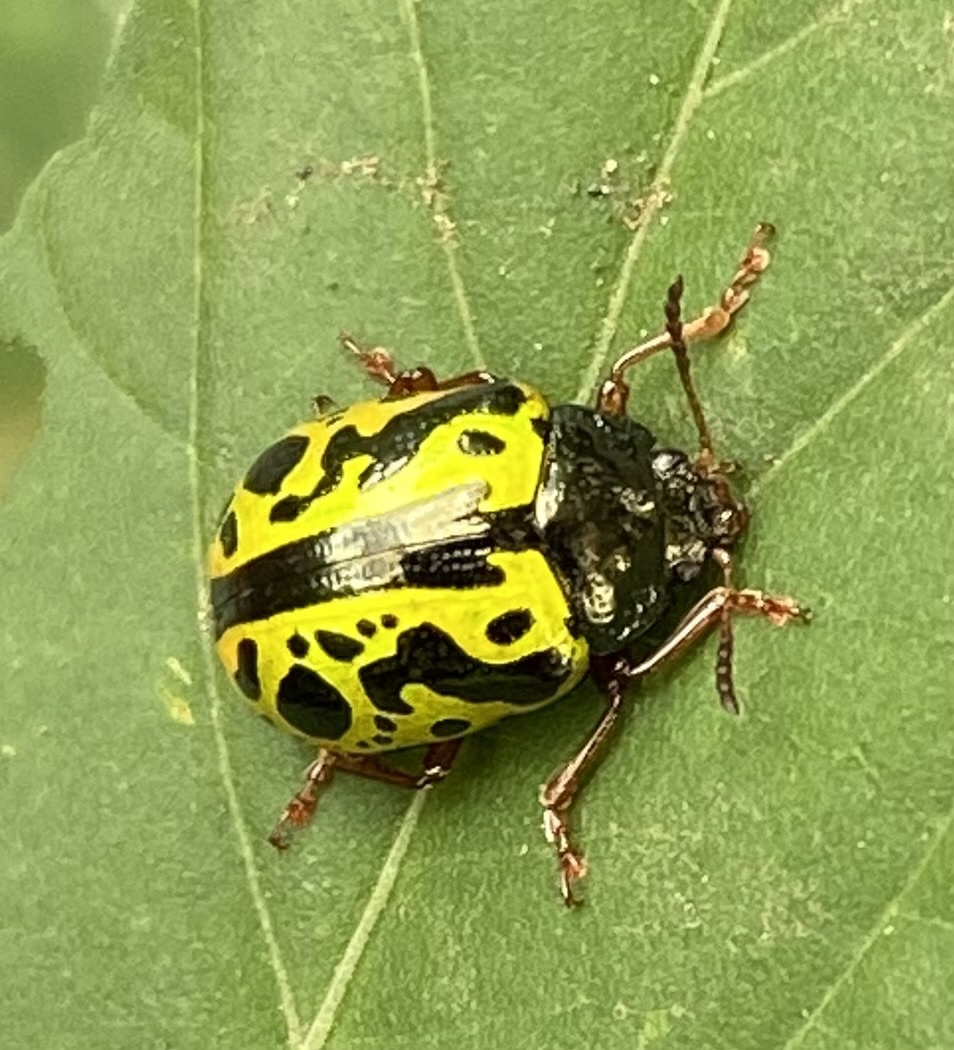
Calligrapha fulvipes, Guatemala

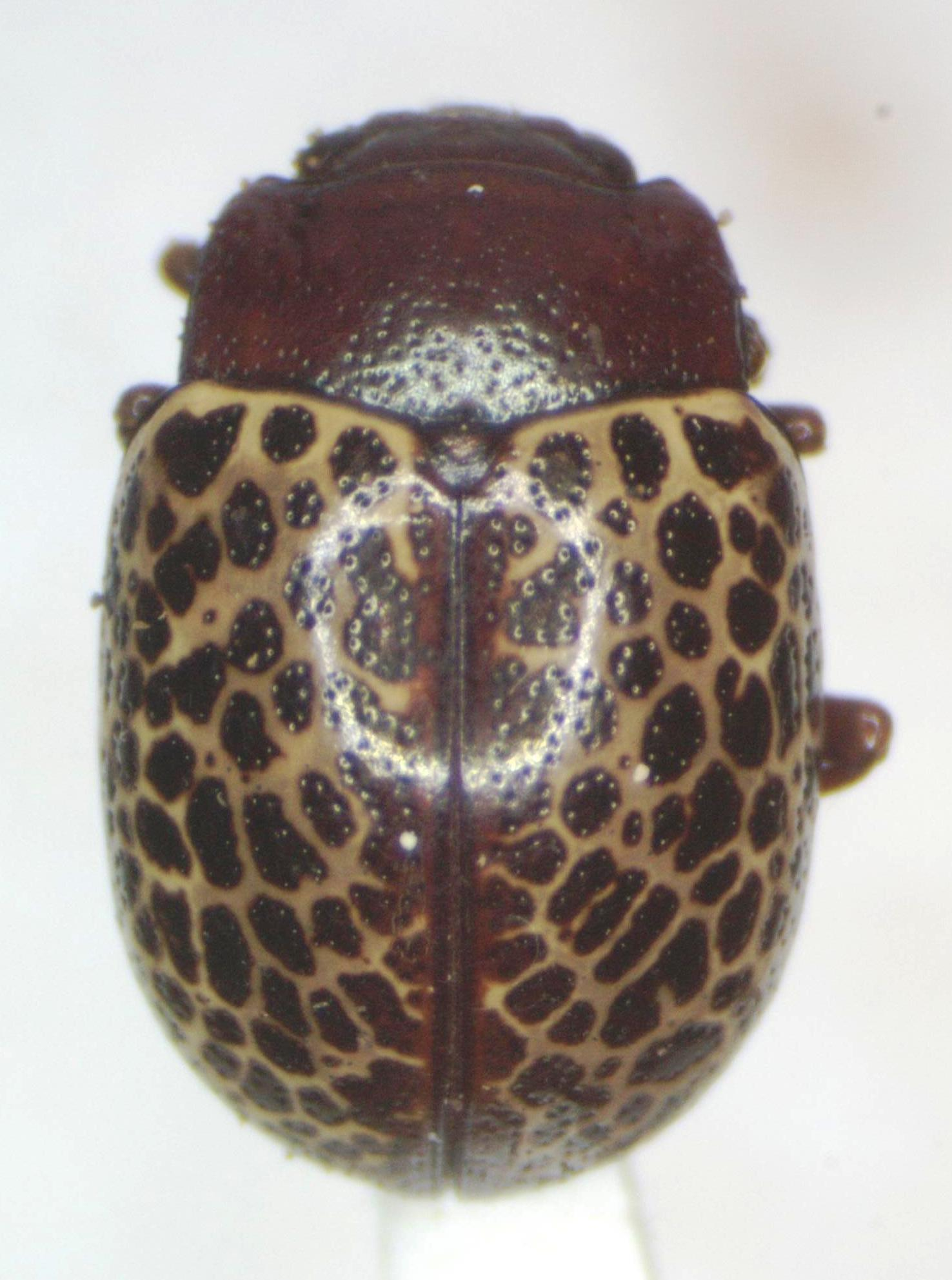
Calligrapha guttulosa, Nicaragua

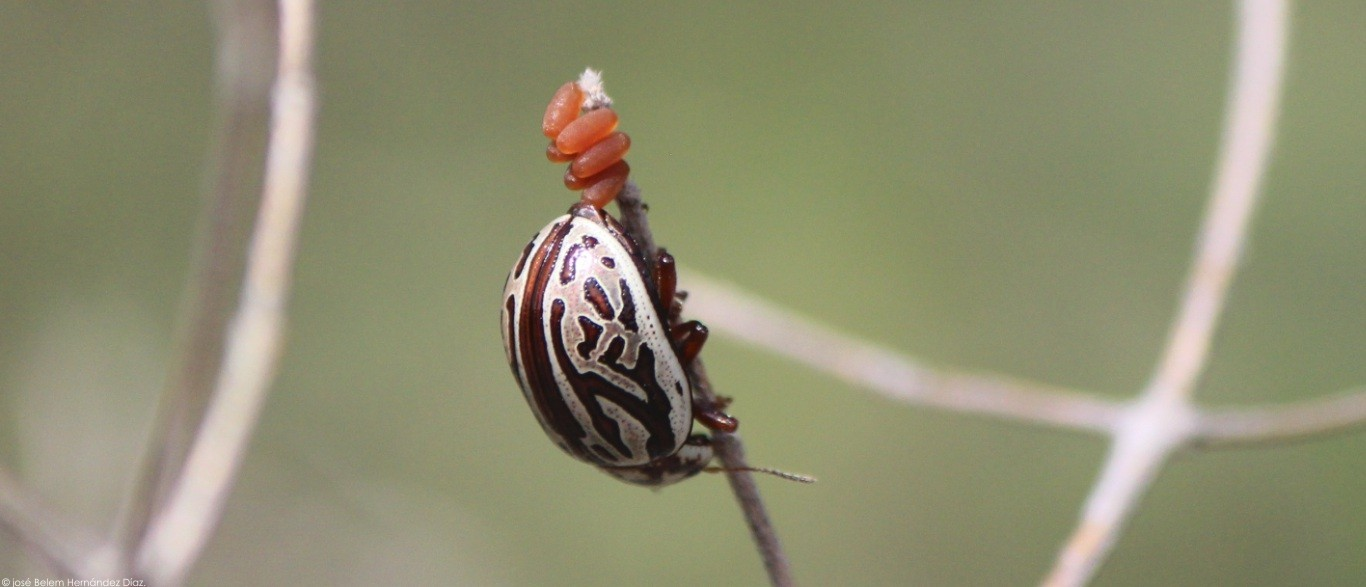
Calligrapha gyllenhali, México

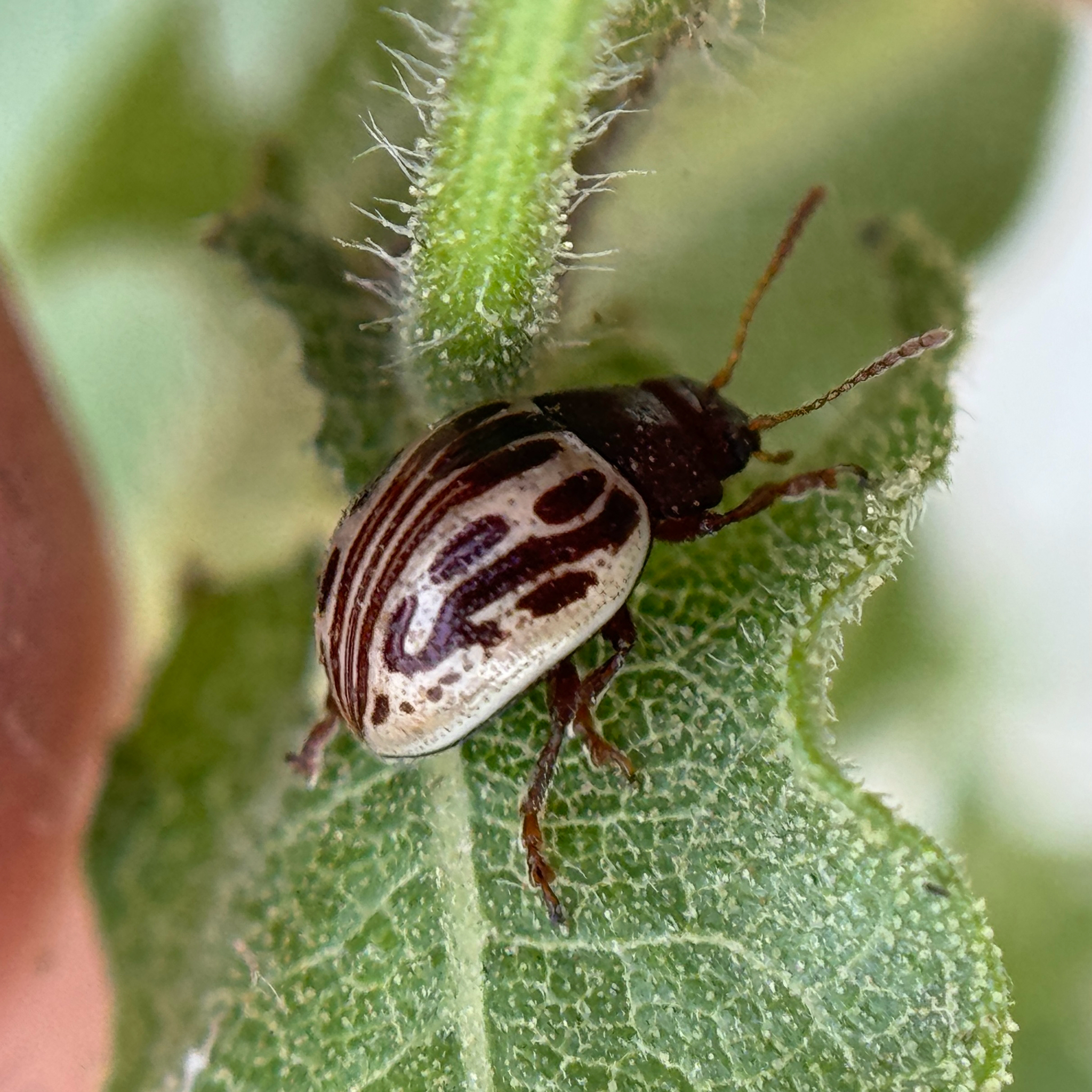
Calligrapha heterothecae, Texas

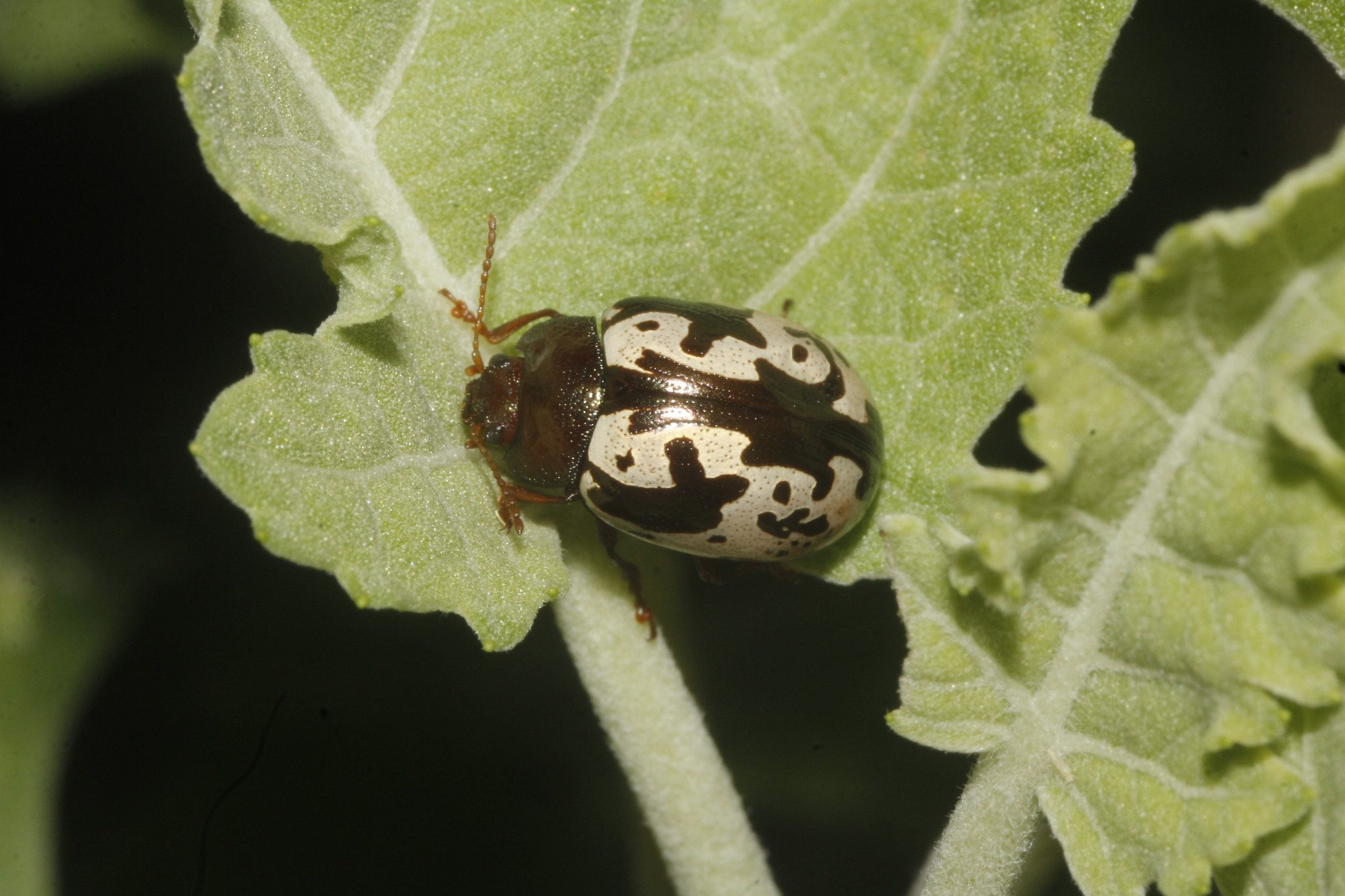
Calligrapha intermedia, México

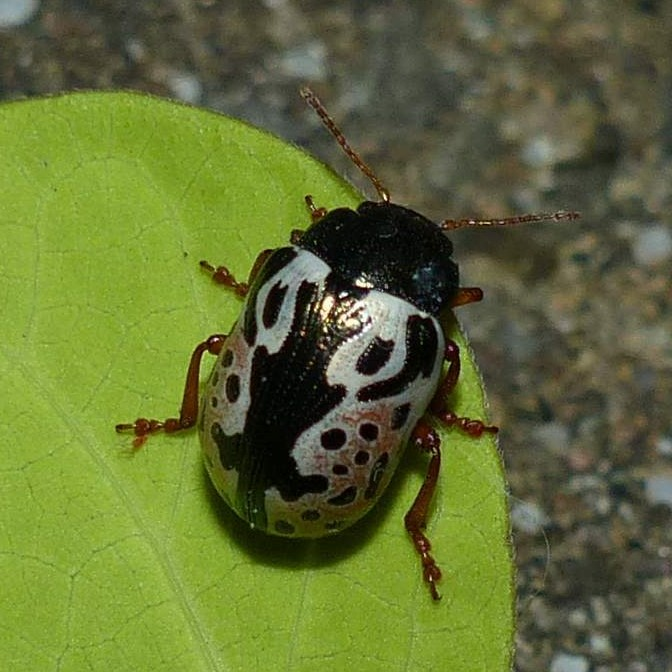
Calligrapha knabi, Canada

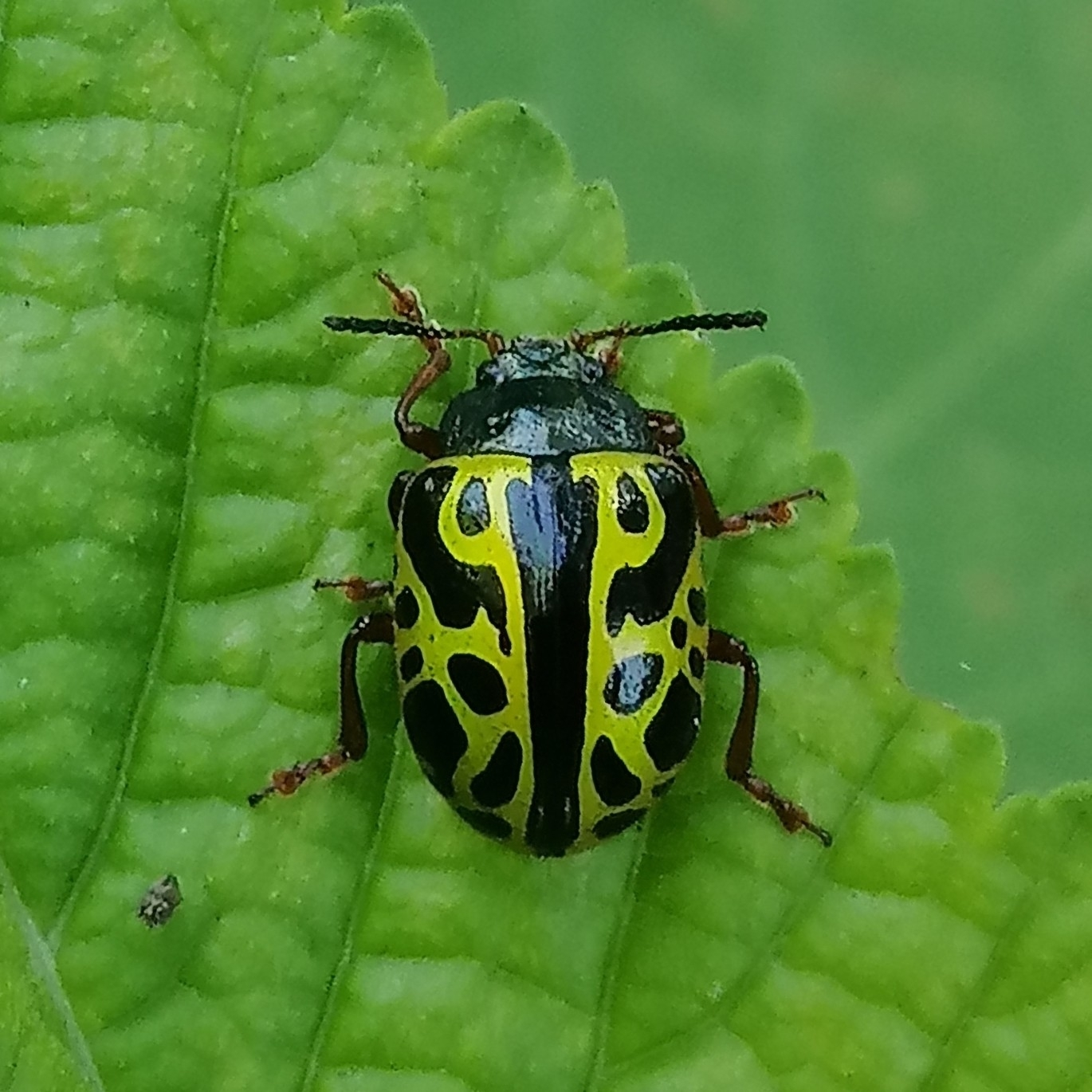
Calligrapha matronalis, Bolivia

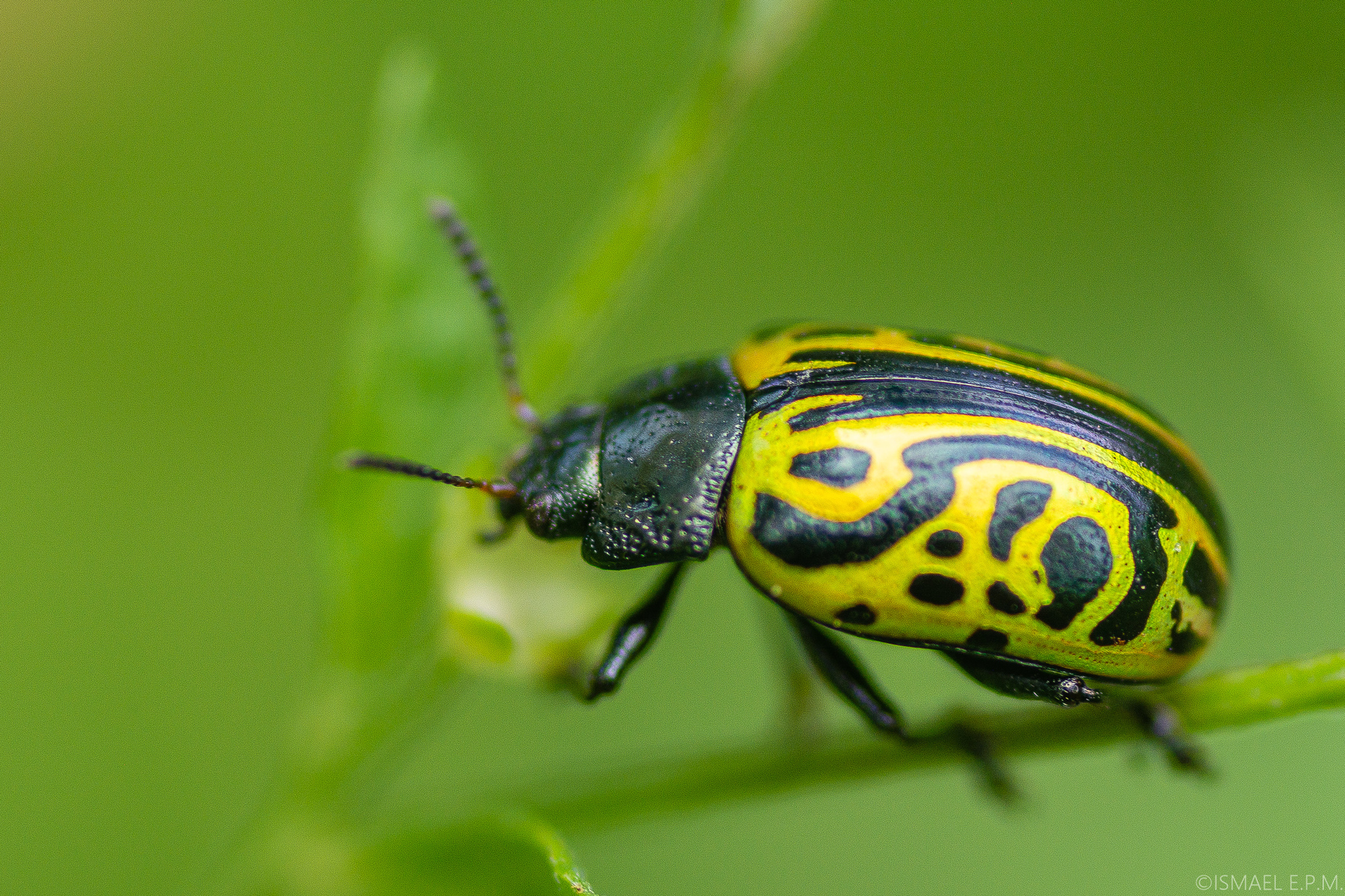
Calligrapha mexicana, México

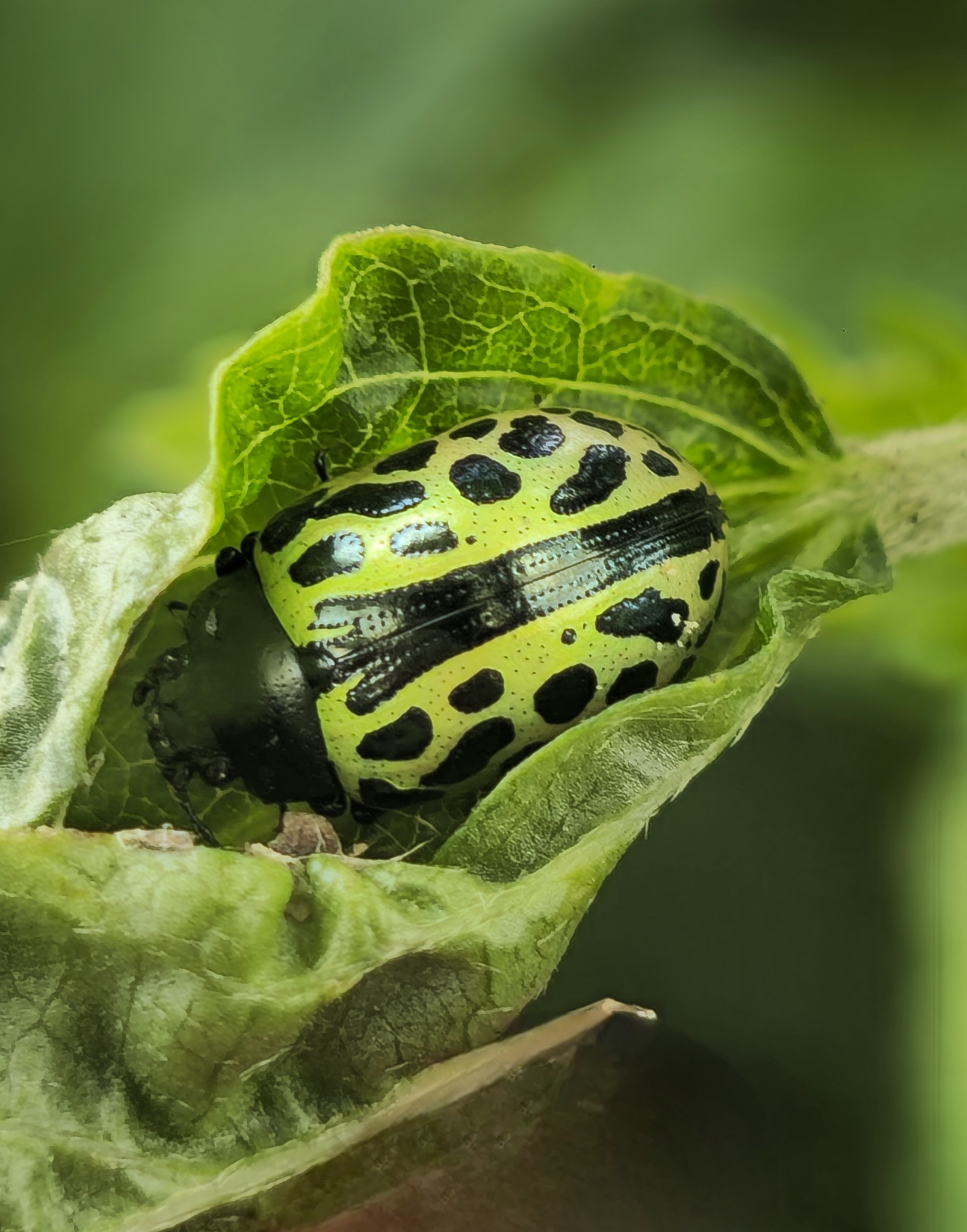
Calligrapha multiplagata, Argentina

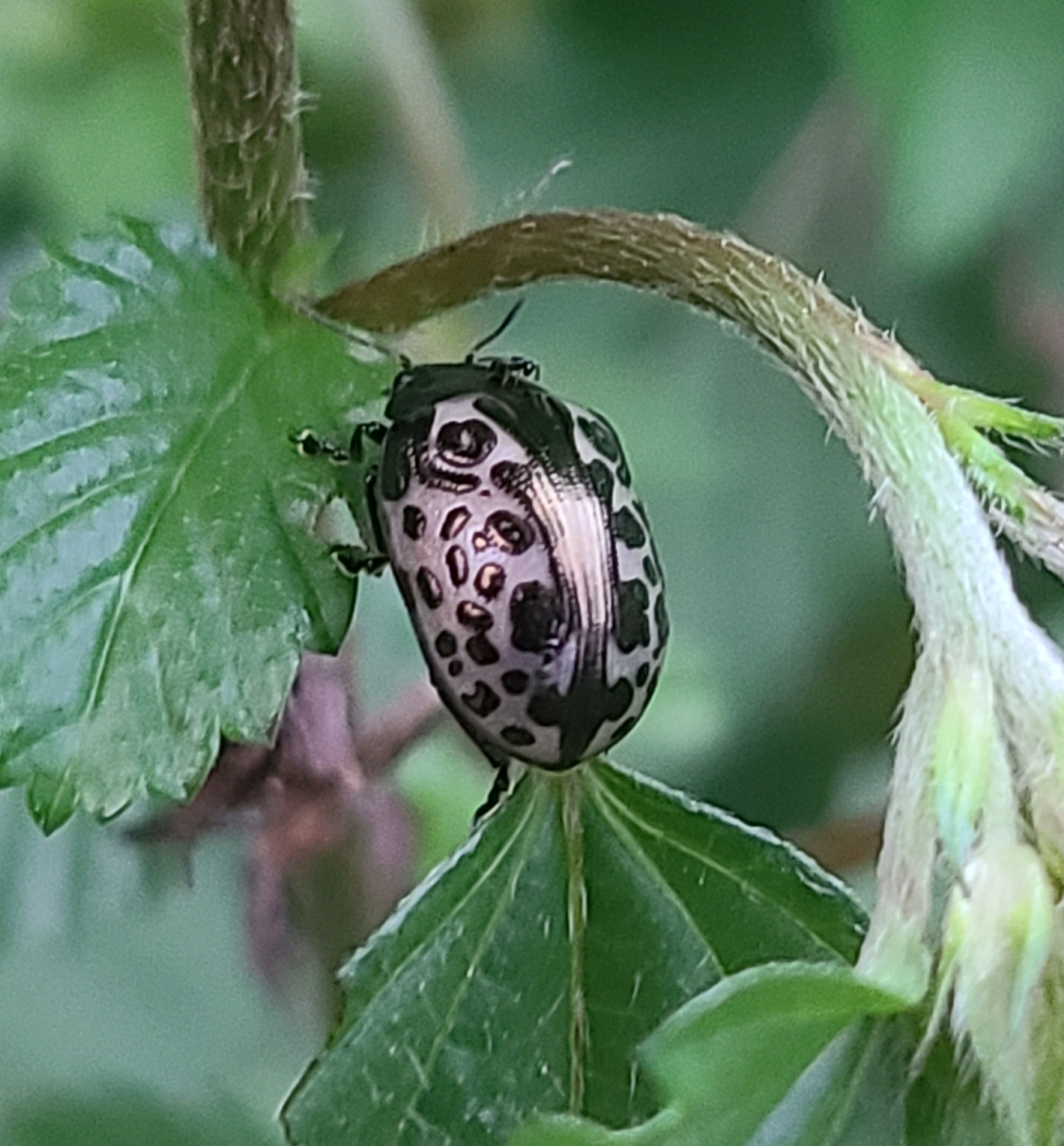
Calligrapha multipustulata, México

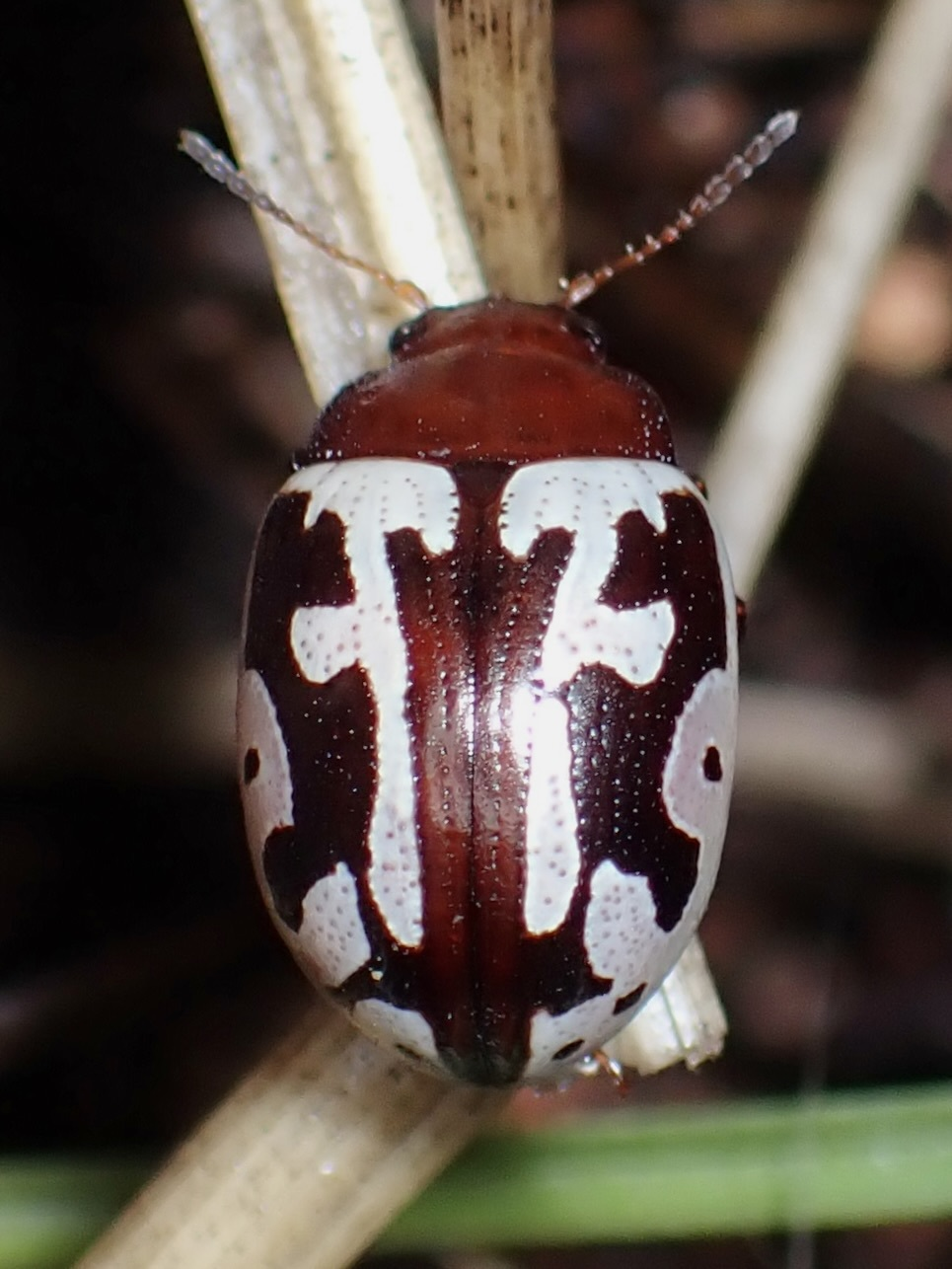
Calligrapha opifera, México

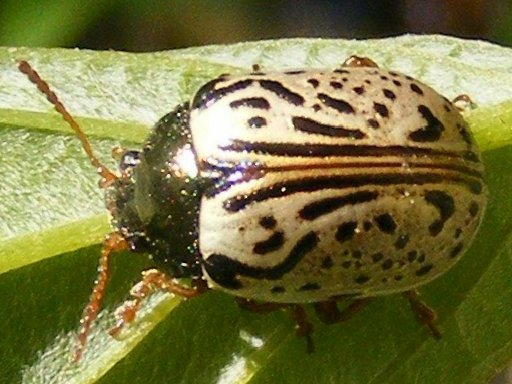
Calligrapha philadelphica

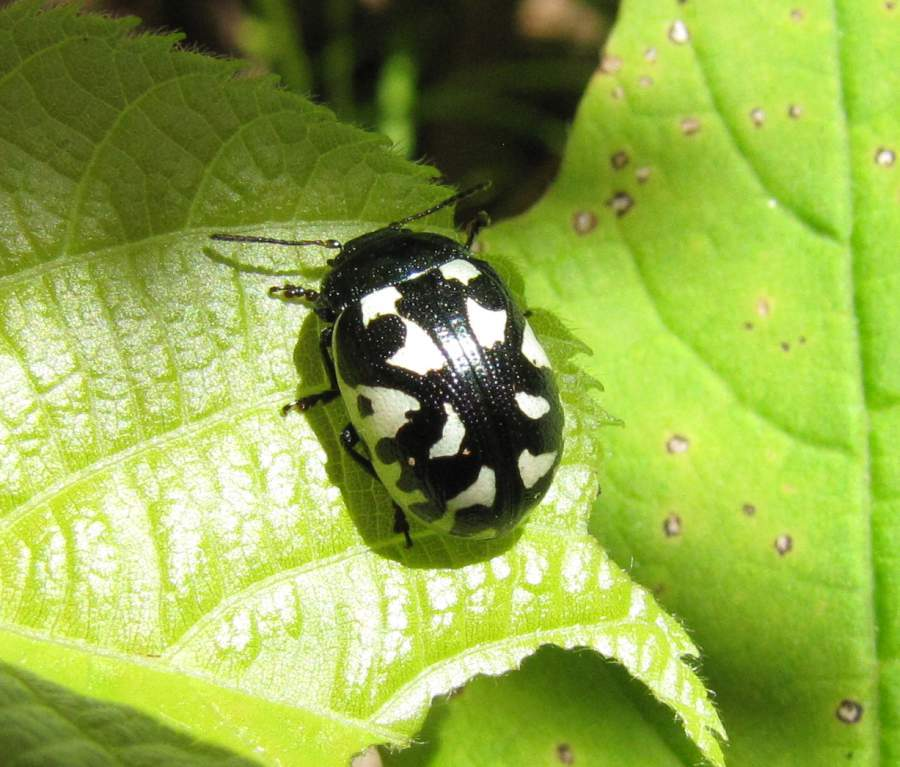
Calligrapha pnirsa, Canada

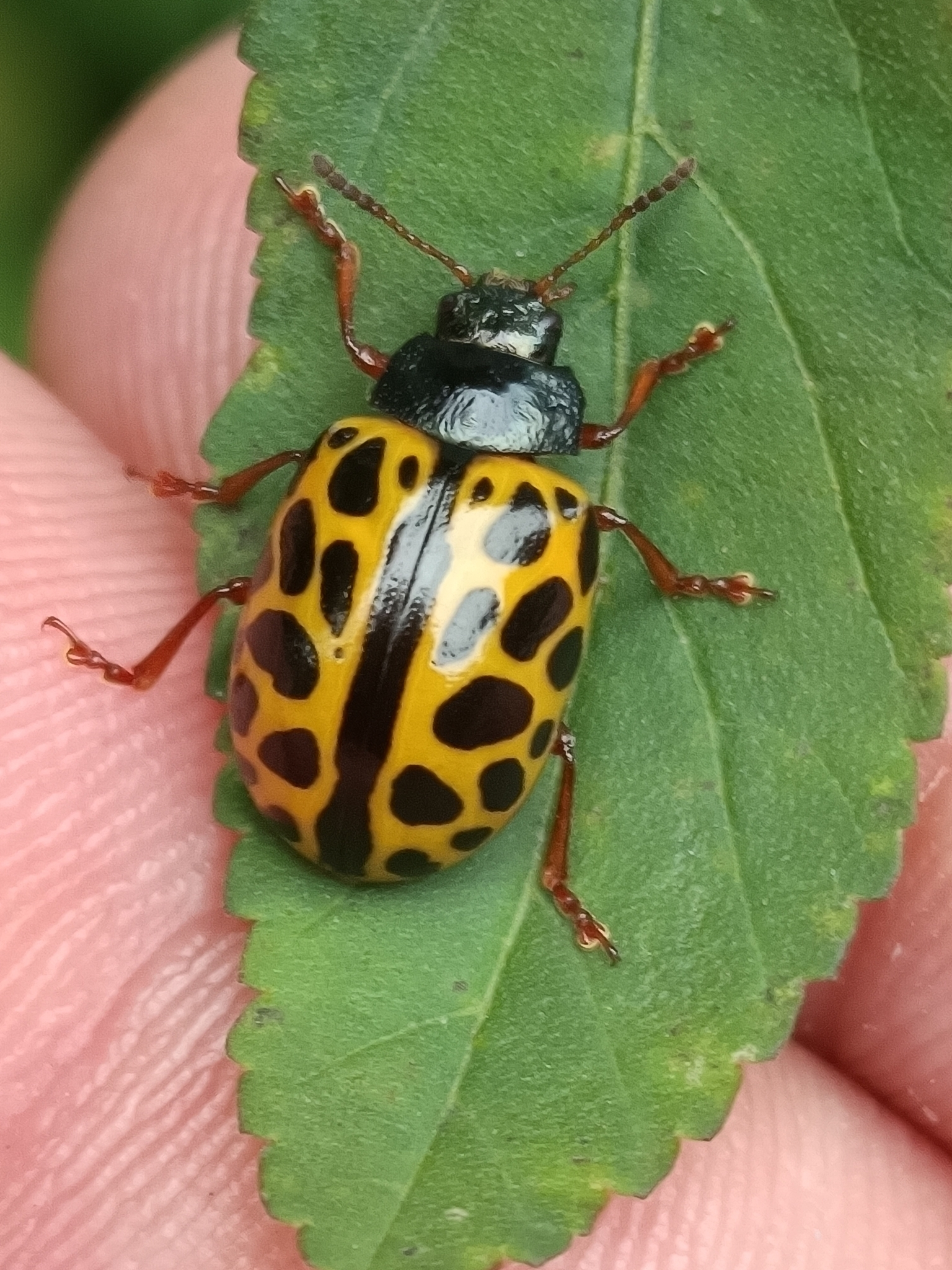
Calligrapha polyspila, Brasil

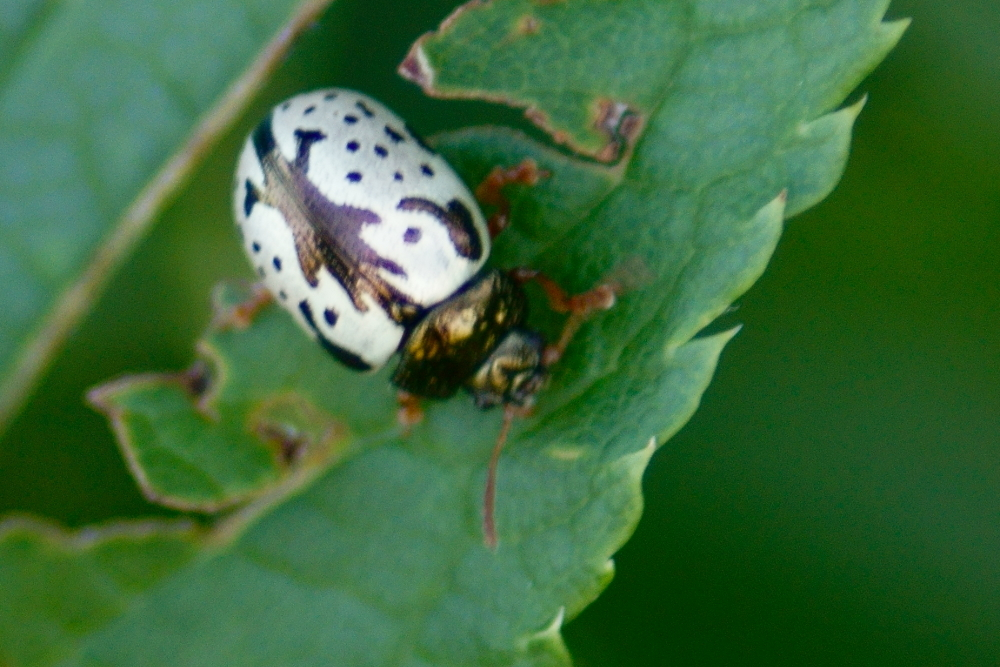
Calligrapha pruni, Illinois

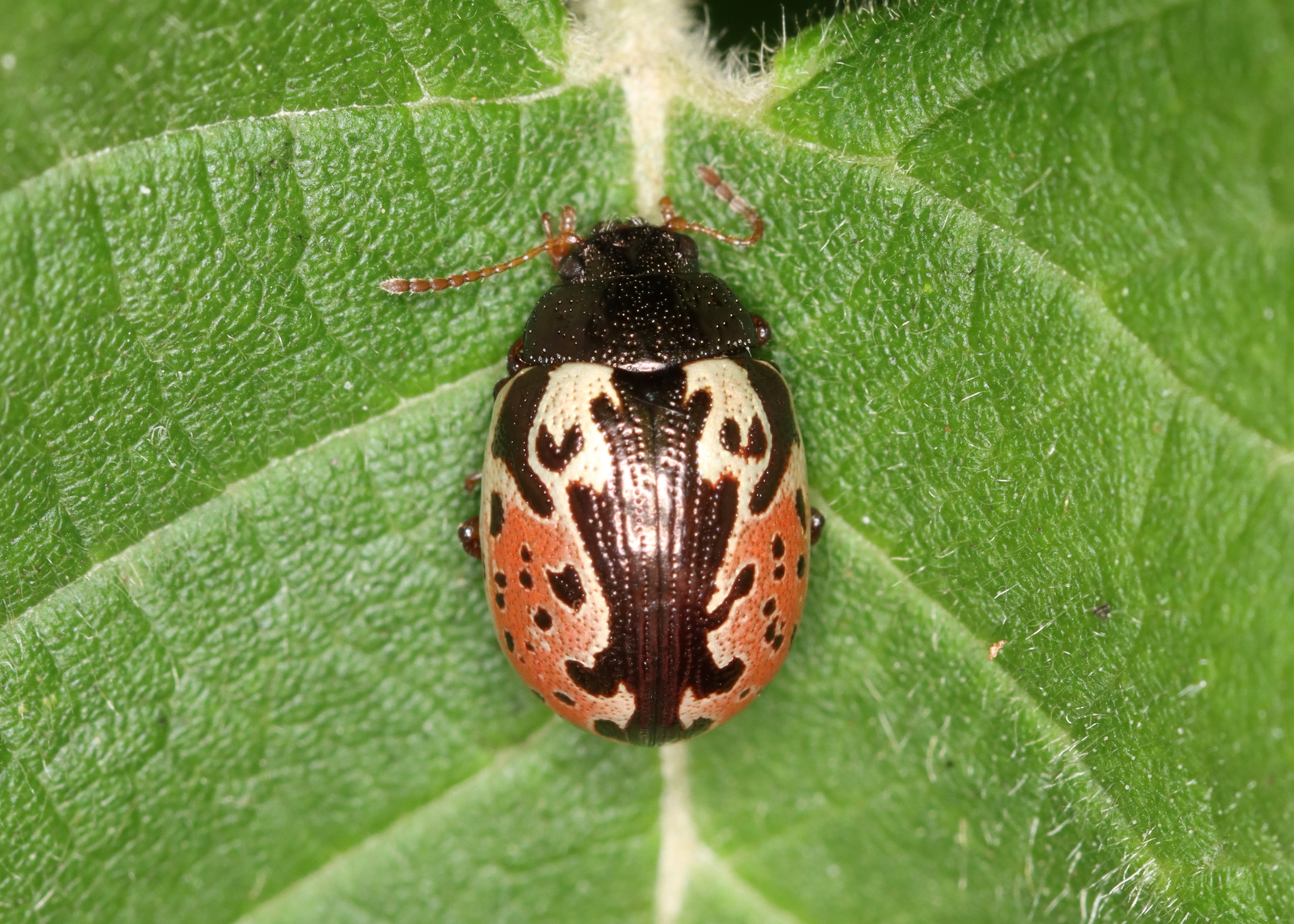
Calligrapha rhoda, Massachusetts

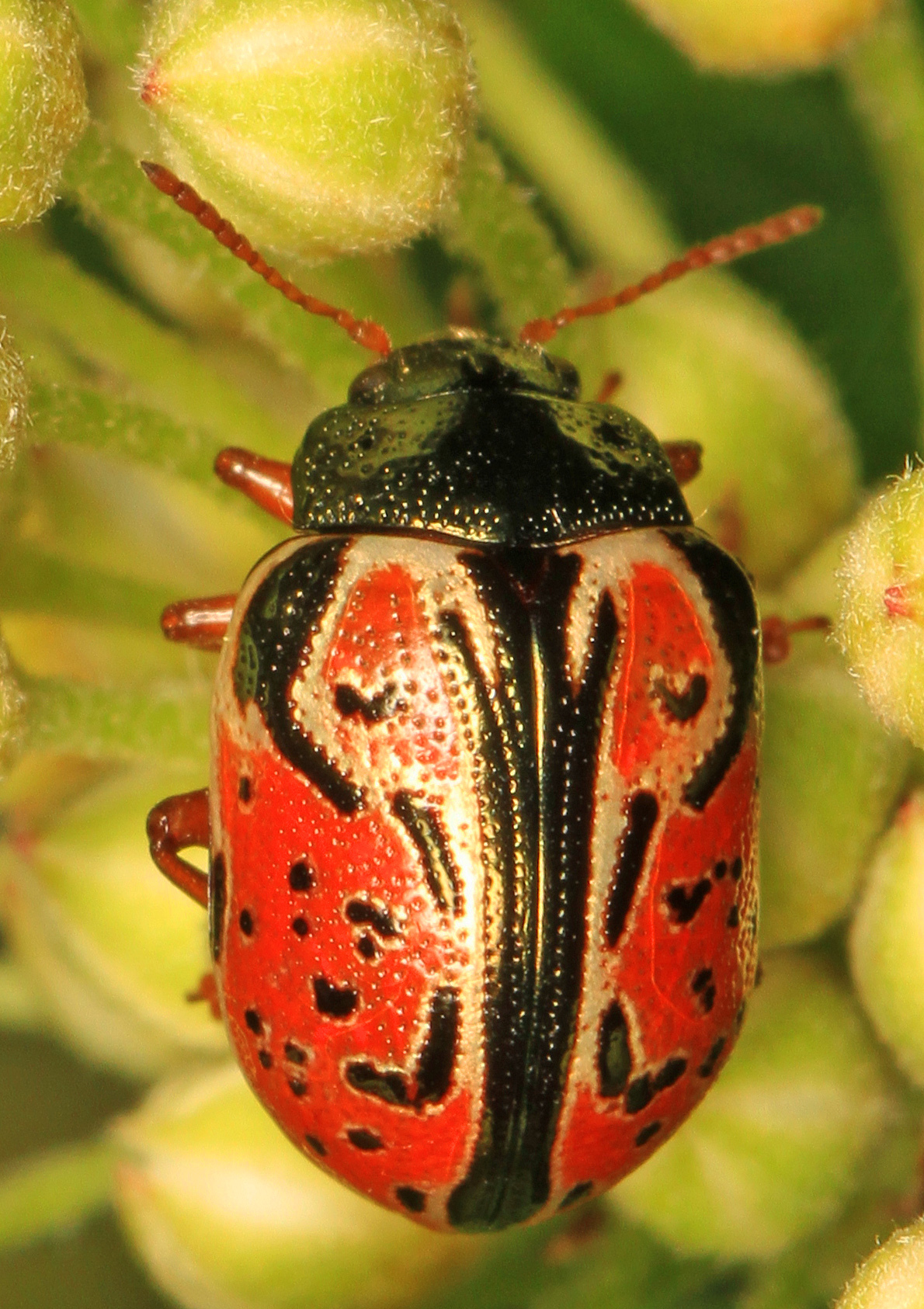
Calligrapha spiraeae, West Virginia

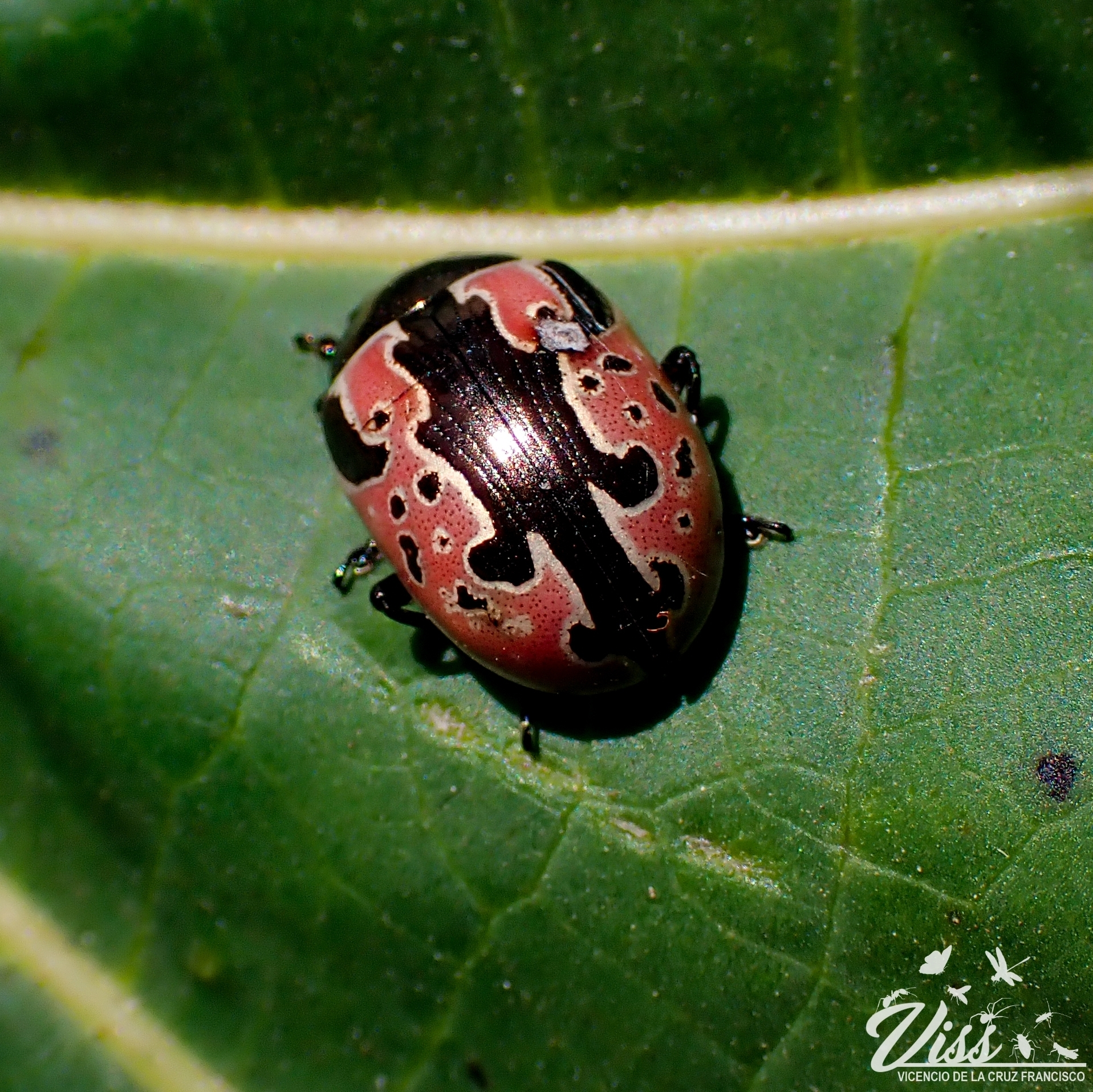
Calligrapha sylvia, México

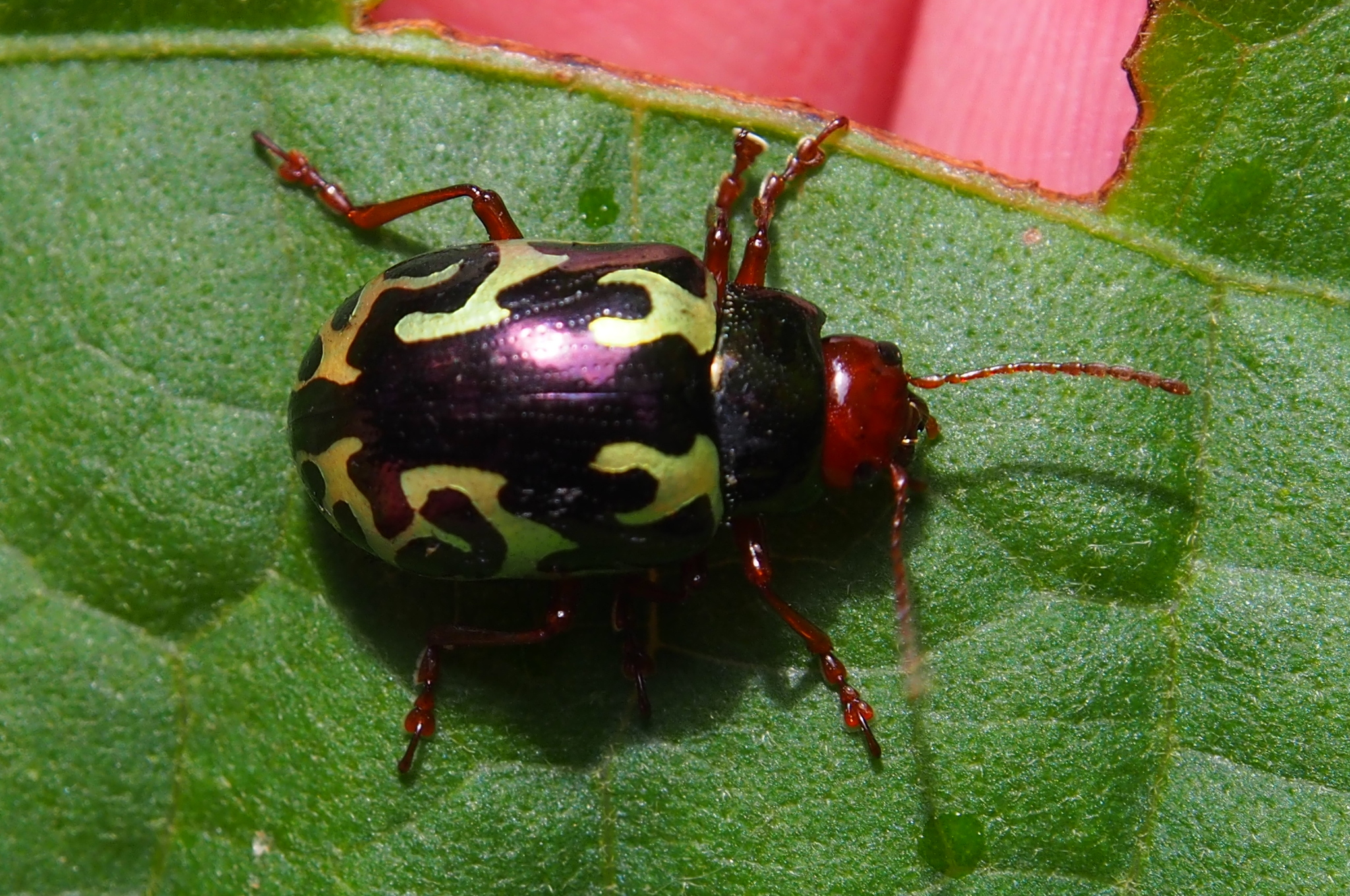
Calligrapha violaceomaculata, Costa Rica
