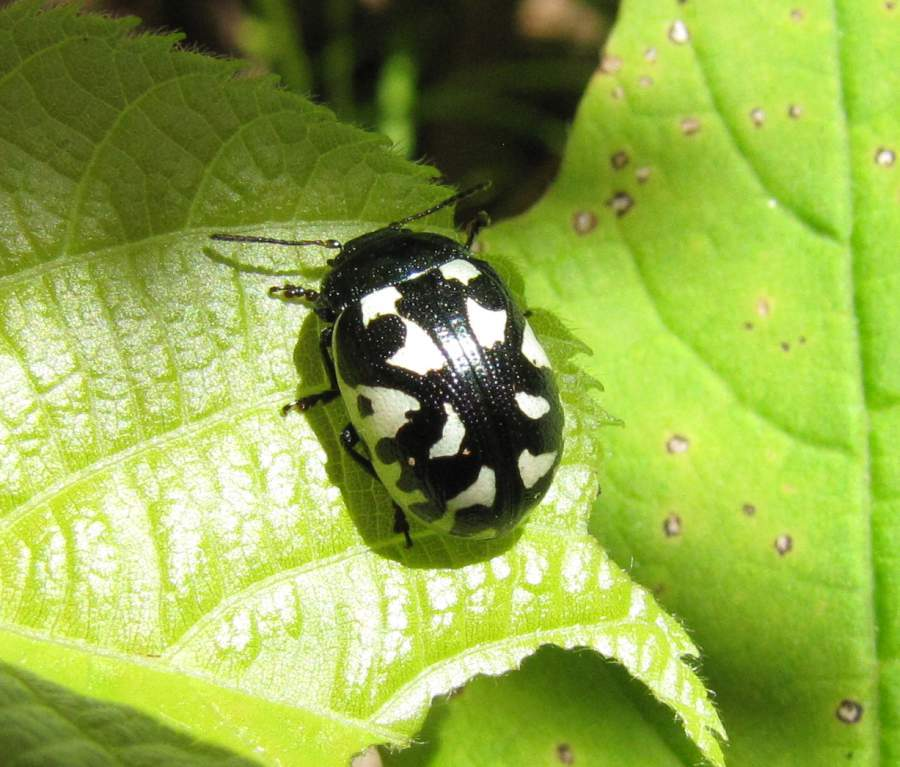
- Calligrapha pnirsa, Ontario, Canada

Scientific classification
- Kingdom: Animalia
- Phylum: Arthropoda
- Clade: Pancrustacea
- Class: Insecta
- Order: Coleoptera
- Suborder: Polyphaga
- Infraorder: Cucujiformia
- Family: Chrysomelidae
- Genus: Calligrapha
- Species: C. pnirsa

Binomial name
- Calligrapha pnirsa Stål, 1860

= Calligrapha pnirsa =

Species of beetle

Calligrapha pnirsa is a species of leaf beetle in the family Chrysomelidae. It is found in North America.
