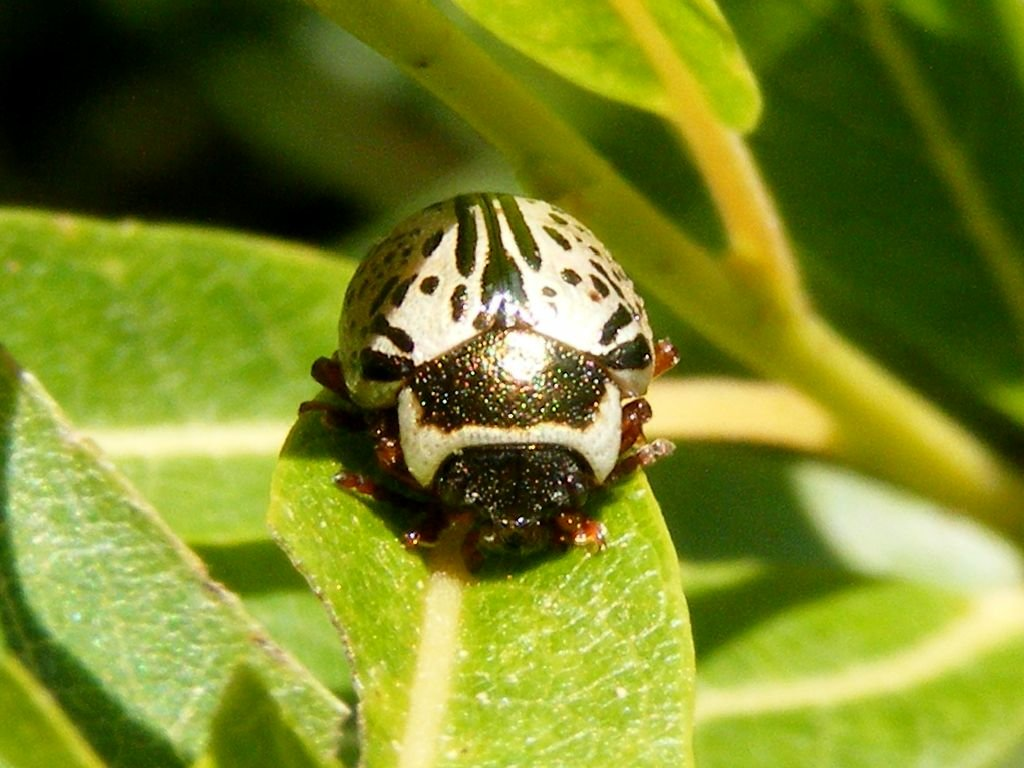

Scientific classification
- Kingdom: Animalia
- Phylum: Arthropoda
- Clade: Pancrustacea
- Class: Insecta
- Order: Coleoptera
- Suborder: Polyphaga
- Infraorder: Cucujiformia
- Family: Chrysomelidae
- Genus: Calligrapha
- Species: C. multipunctata

Binomial name
- Calligrapha multipunctata (Say, 1824)

= Calligrapha multipunctata =

Species of beetle

Calligrapha multipunctata, the common willow calligrapha, is a species of leaf beetle in the family Chrysomelidae. It is found in North America.

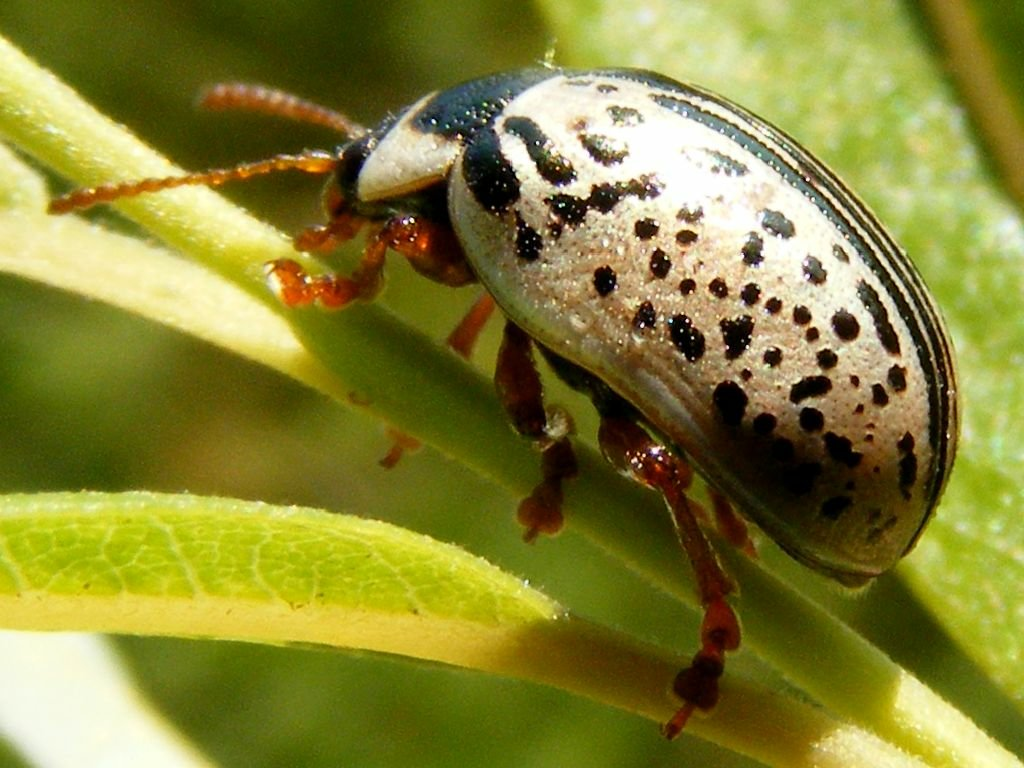
Common willow calligrapha, Calligrapha multipunctata

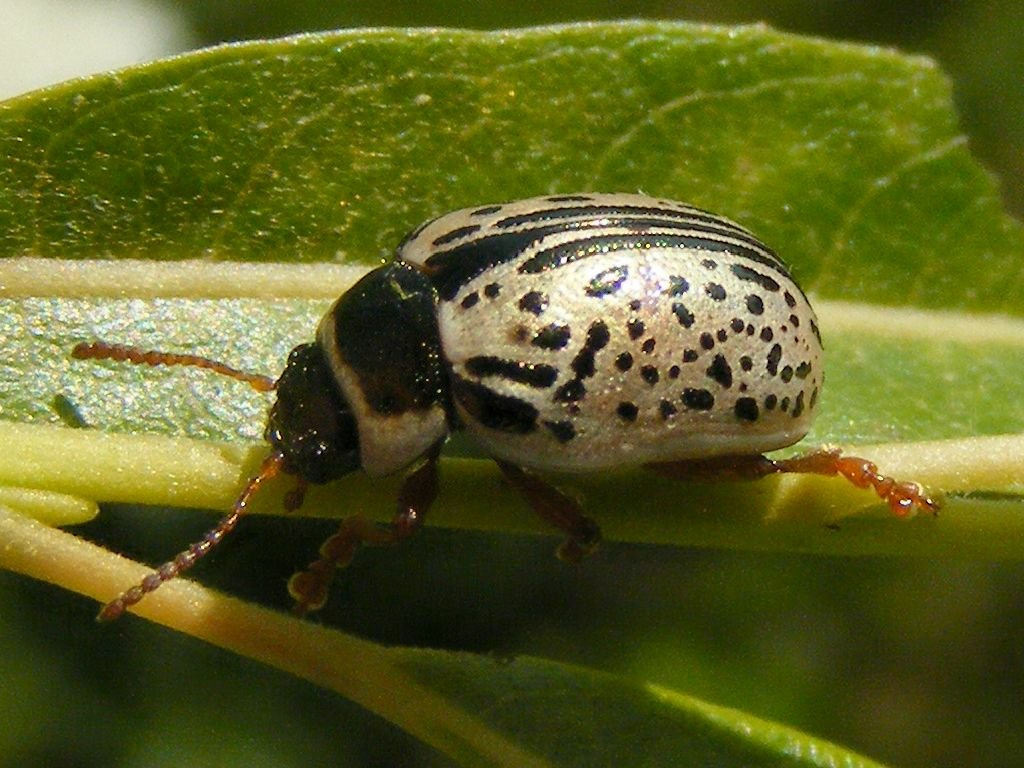
Common willow calligrapha, Calligrapha multipunctata

== Subspecies ==
These three subspecies have been assigned to the species Calligrapha multipunctata:

- Calligrapha multipunctata bigsbyana
- Calligrapha multipunctata multipunctata
- Calligrapha multipunctata suturella Schaeffer (which now may be considered a separate species)
