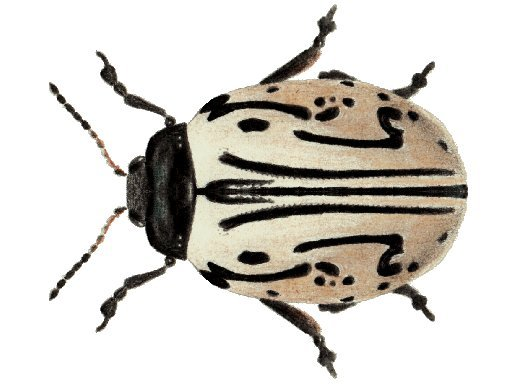

Scientific classification
- Kingdom: Animalia
- Phylum: Arthropoda
- Clade: Pancrustacea
- Class: Insecta
- Order: Coleoptera
- Suborder: Polyphaga
- Infraorder: Cucujiformia
- Family: Chrysomelidae
- Genus: Calligrapha
- Species: C. dislocata

Binomial name
- Calligrapha dislocata (Rogers, 1856)

= Calligrapha dislocata =

Species of beetle

Calligrapha dislocata is a species of leaf beetle in the family Chrysomelidae. It is found in Central America and North America.
