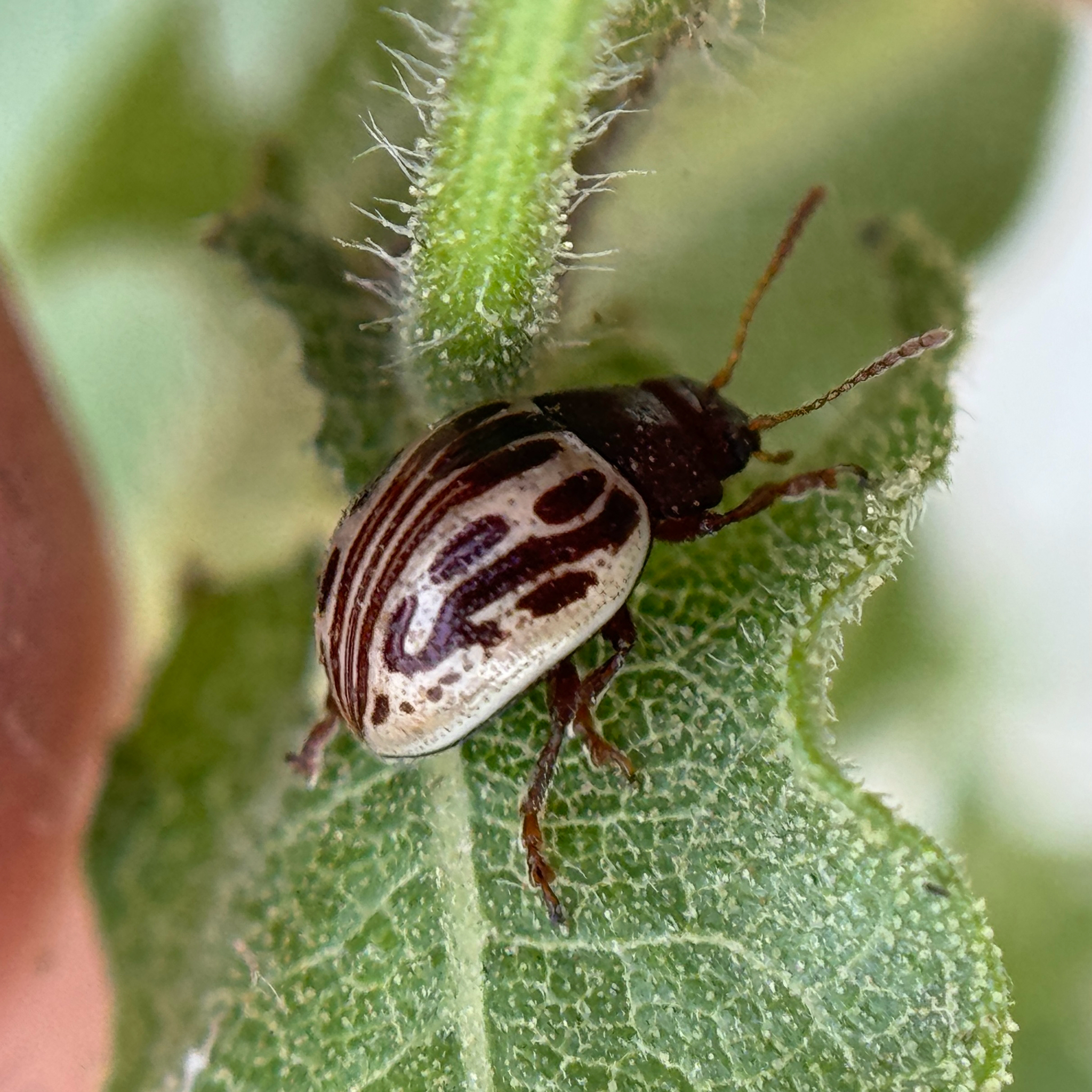
- Calligrapha heterothecae, Texas

Scientific classification
- Kingdom: Animalia
- Phylum: Arthropoda
- Clade: Pancrustacea
- Class: Insecta
- Order: Coleoptera
- Suborder: Polyphaga
- Infraorder: Cucujiformia
- Family: Chrysomelidae
- Subfamily: Chrysomelinae
- Tribe: Chrysomelini
- Genus: Calligrapha
- Species: C. heterothecae

Binomial name
- Calligrapha heterothecae (Linell, 1896)

= Calligrapha heterothecae =

Species of beetle

Calligrapha heterothecae is a species of leaf beetle belonging to the family Chrysomelidae, in the subgenus Zygogramma, which was formerly a genus.

== Description ==
C. heterothecae is a small leaf beetle with a brown pronotum and yellow elytra marked with elongated brown stripes.

== Distribution and habitat ==
C. heterothecae is native to North America. Adult beetles are associated exclusively with camphorweed (Heterotheca subaxillaris).

== Behaviour and ecology ==
=== Predators ===
C. heterothecae is predated by the two-spotted stink bug (Perillus bioculatus) and the spined soldier bug (Podisus maculiventris).
