= Perillus splendidus =

Scientific classification
- Domain: Eukaryota
- Kingdom: Animalia
- Phylum: Arthropoda
- Class: Insecta
- Order: Hemiptera
- Suborder: Heteroptera
- Family: Pentatomidae
- Genus: Perillus
- Species: P. splendidus

Binomial name
- Perillus splendidus (Uhler, 1861)

Species of true bug

Perillus splendidus is a species of predatory stink bug in the family Pentatomidae. It is found in Central America and North America.
