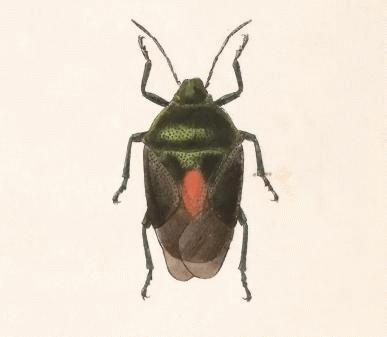

Scientific classification
- Domain: Eukaryota
- Kingdom: Animalia
- Phylum: Arthropoda
- Class: Insecta
- Order: Hemiptera
- Suborder: Heteroptera
- Family: Pentatomidae
- Genus: Perillus
- Species: P. confluens

Binomial name
- Perillus confluens (Herrich-schaeffer, 1839)

Synonyms
- Asopus confluens Herrich-Schaeffer, 1839

= Perillus confluens =

Species of true bug

Perillus confluens is a species of predatory stink bugs in the family Pentatomidae. It is found in Central America and North America.
