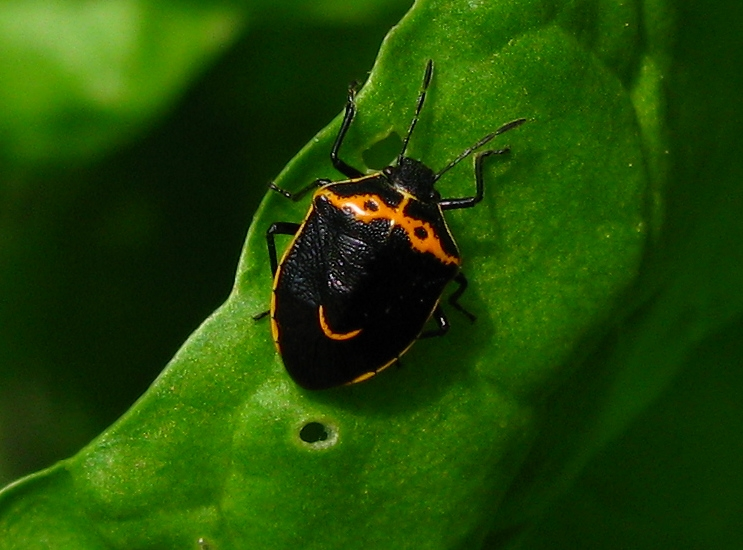
- Adult

Scientific classification
- Domain: Eukaryota
- Kingdom: Animalia
- Phylum: Arthropoda
- Class: Insecta
- Order: Hemiptera
- Suborder: Heteroptera
- Family: Pentatomidae
- Genus: Cosmopepla
- Species: C. conspicillaris

Binomial name
- Cosmopepla conspicillaris (Dallas, 1851)

= Cosmopepla conspicillaris =

Species of true bug

Cosmopepla conspicillaris is a species of insect in the family Pentatomidae first described by William Dallas in 1851. Due to its common preference for plants in the genus Stachys, it is often called the hedgenettle stink bug. It is also known as the conspicuous stink bug, two-spotted stink bug or happy bespectacled stink bug depending on locality. The name two-spotted stink bug is better applied to another species, Perillus bioculatus (Fabricius, 1775).

== Appearance ==
C. conspicillaris is a showy stink bug with a black base colour and orange outer markings. This species differs from other genus members by the white chevron-shaped tip of the scutellum, and the orange "spectacles" on the dorsal thorax. While other species may show similar markings, they differ in number of spectacle spots, colouration and host plant.
