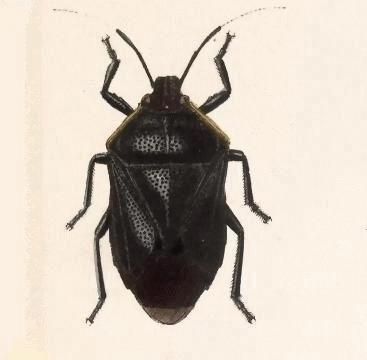

Scientific classification
- Domain: Eukaryota
- Kingdom: Animalia
- Phylum: Arthropoda
- Class: Insecta
- Order: Hemiptera
- Suborder: Heteroptera
- Family: Pentatomidae
- Genus: Perillus
- Species: P. circumcinctus

Binomial name
- Perillus circumcinctus Stal, 1862

= Perillus circumcinctus =

Species of true bug

Perillus circumcinctus is a species of predatory stink bug in the family Pentatomidae. It is found in North America. It is specialized to prey upon Chrysomelidae beetles. They reproduce in early summer.
