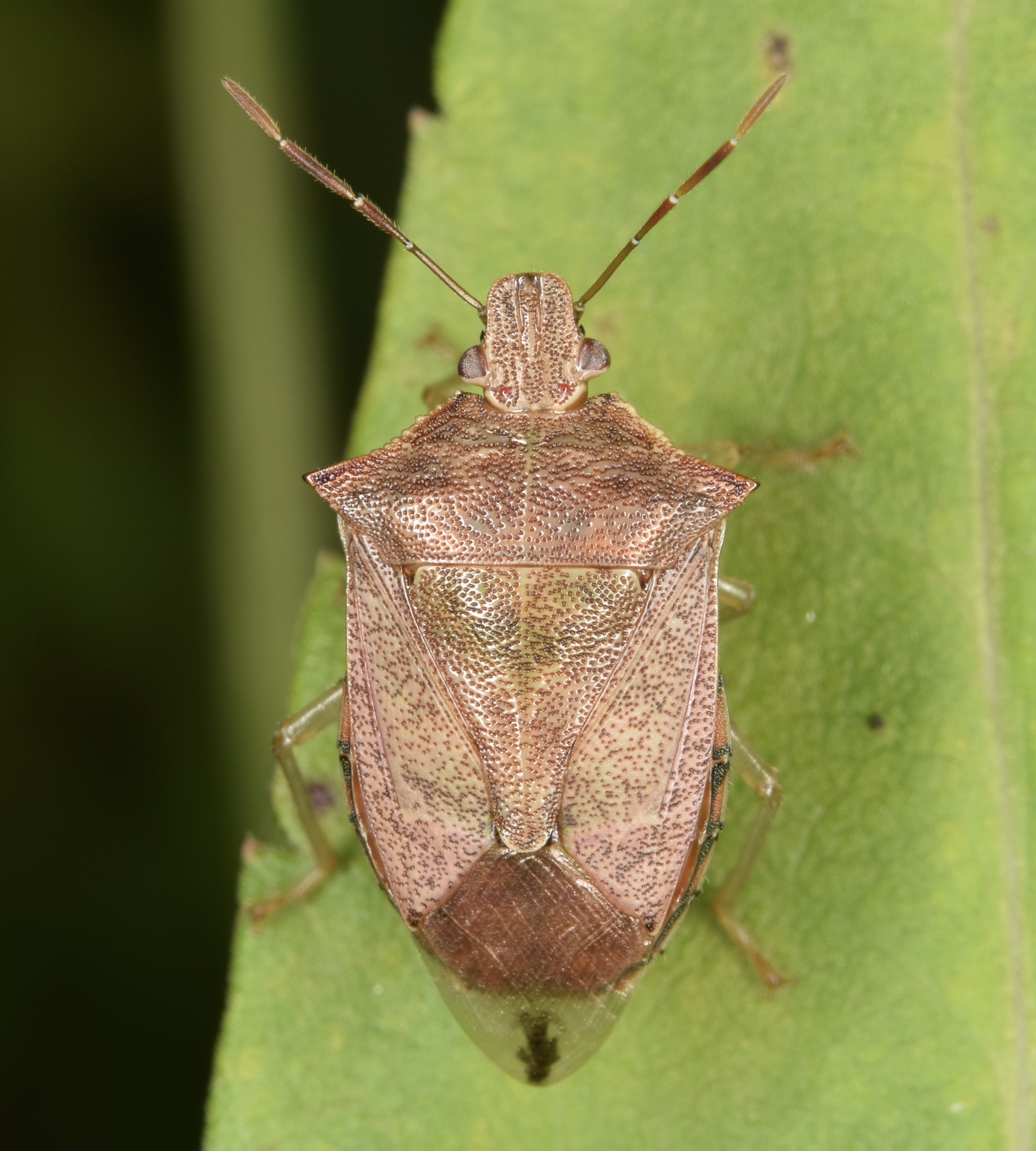

Scientific classification
- Kingdom: Animalia
- Phylum: Arthropoda
- Clade: Pancrustacea
- Class: Insecta
- Order: Hemiptera
- Suborder: Heteroptera
- Family: Pentatomidae
- Genus: Podisus
- Species: P. maculiventris

Binomial name
- Podisus maculiventris (Say, 1832)

= Spined soldier bug =

Podisus maculiventris

Species of true bug

Podisus maculiventris, the spined soldier bug, is a medium-sized predatory shield bug common in North America. It has prominent spines on each "shoulder" and preys on a wide variety of arthropods, particularly the larval forms of Lepidoptera and Coleoptera. As a generalist predator of many agricultural pests, P. maculiventris is generally considered a beneficial insect in gardens and crop fields.

== Description ==
The coloration of P. maculiventris ranges from pale brown to tan. The body is shield-shaped with prominent, well-defined "shoulders." A distinguishing feature is the presence of a black streak on the wing membrane, along with spined humeri, which serve as key diagnostic characteristics.

Adults and nymphs can be observed sucking and feeding on prey using their tubular mouthparts, which they can extend forward in front of the body. This differs from plant-feeding stink bugs where the mouthparts point downward when feeding. Both plant-feeding and predaceous stink bugs can fold their mouthparts backward underneath the body.

=== Egg ===
Approximately 1 mm in diameter, with small spines around the top that are especially characteristic of the genus Podisus. Eggs are laid 17 to 70 at a time, in lines or oval-shaped groupings.

=== Nymph ===
The nymphs of Podisus maculiventris develop through five instars, gradually increasing in size and changing in appearance. The 1st instar is small (around 1.4mm), with a blackish head and thorax and a reddish abdomen with black markings. The 2nd instar closely resembles the first but begins feeding on other insects, exhibiting highly cannibalistic behavior. By the 3rd instar, the nymphs develop distinctive black, orange, and white markings on their reddish abdomen. The 4th instar maintains similar coloration but gains noticeable wing pads. In the 5th and final instar, the wing pads become prominent, the head and thorax appear mottled with brown, and the abdominal markings transition to white or tan with black.

=== Adult ===
Adult Podisus maculiventris are about 11 mm long, with females being slightly larger than males. They have a mottled brown appearance, resembling Alcaeorrhynchus grandis, but can be distinguished by their smaller size and the shape of their spines. While A. grandis grows over 15 mm long and has a single outward-facing spine on each shoulder, P. maculiventris has two forward-pointing spines. Another distinguishing feature of P. maculiventris is the presence of two blackish spots near the tip of each hind femur.

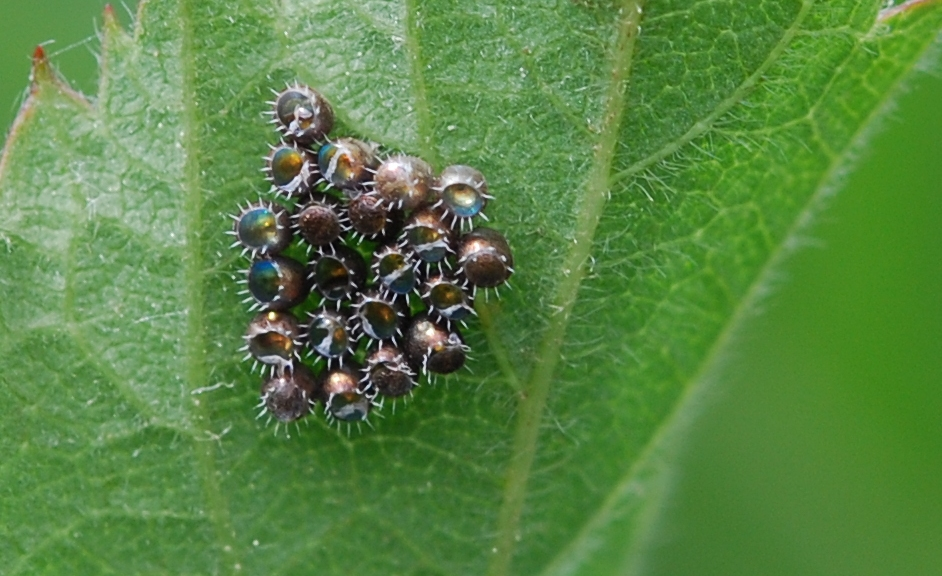
Podisus maculiventris eggs

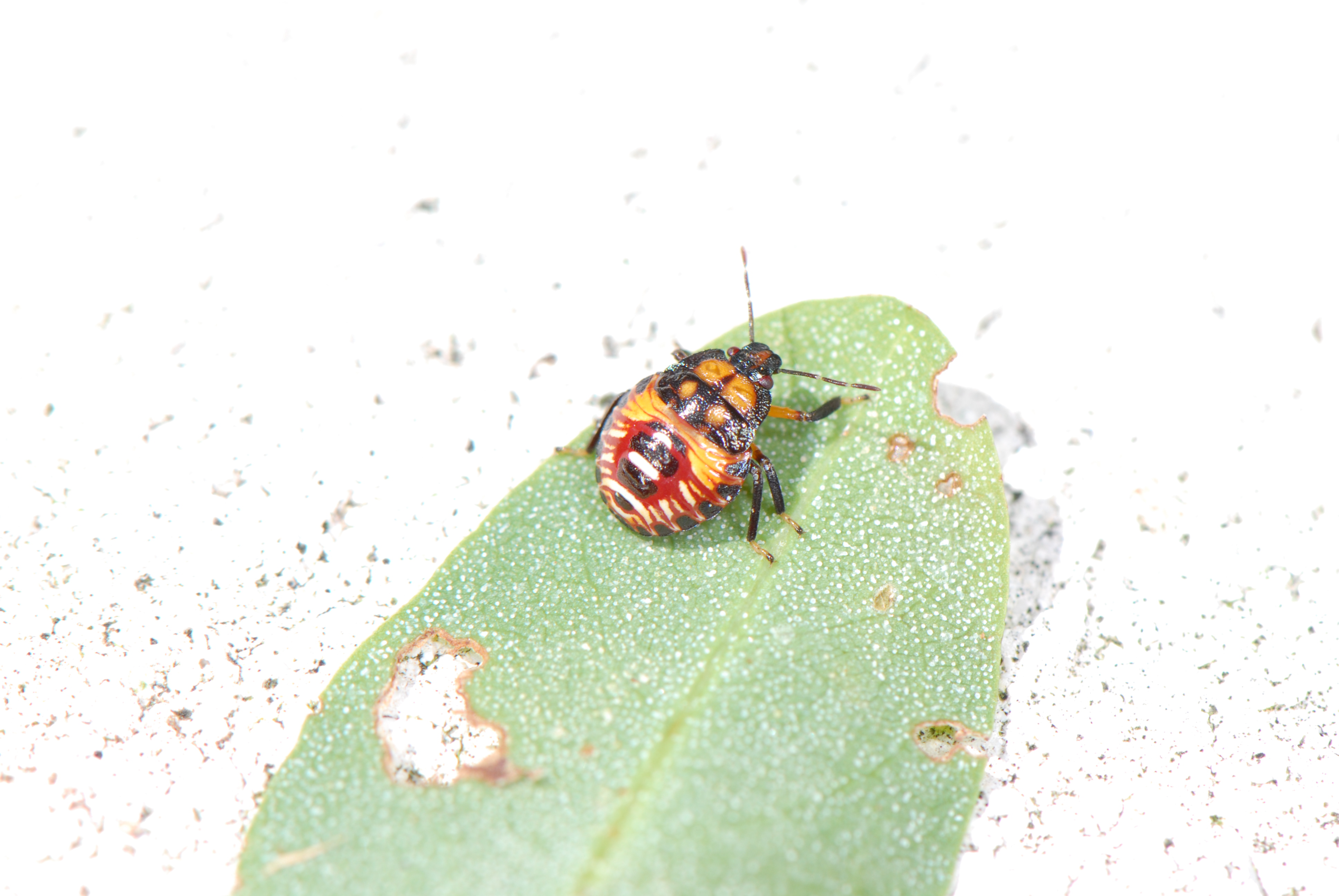
Podisus maculiventris nymph (3rd instar)

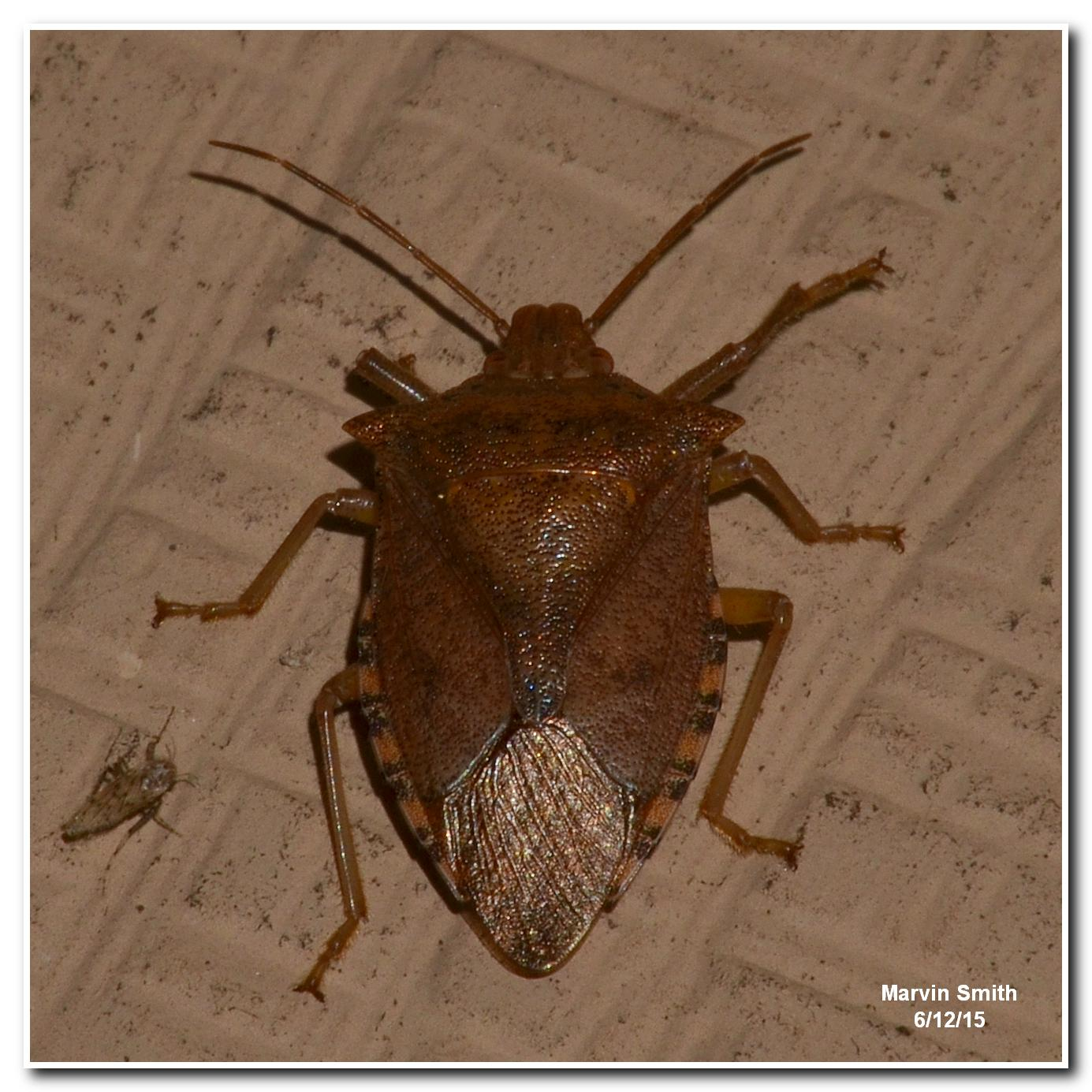
Podisus maculiventris adult

== Range ==
P. maculiventris is the most common predatory shield bug in North America and ranges from Mexico, the Bahamas, and parts of the West Indies, north into Canada. It has also been introduced into other countries as part of classical biological control programs.

== Habitat ==
The spined soldier bug is prevalent throughout North America, ranging from Mexico and the Bahamas to Canada. It inhabits diverse environments, including woodlands, areas near streams, and various agricultural systems. This species is commonly associated with crops. Both adults and nymphs forage on these plants, primarily preying on other insects. In warmer regions like peninsular Florida, the spined soldier bug remains active year-round, while in cooler climates, it typically becomes active in the spring.

== Ecology ==
=== Life cycle ===
Studies on Podisus maculiventris have shown that the time it takes to develop from egg to adult varies depending on temperature and daylight conditions, typically ranging from 27 to 38 days. The eggs hatch in about five to nine days, with the shortest development times reported in Florida. Adults can live anywhere from one to four months. Young nymphs tend to stay together in groups but become more independent as they molt and grow. Their feeding habits and energy use have been well studied, and historical research has provided valuable insights into their life cycle. In warmer regions like Florida, these bugs remain active year-round, though in northern areas, they usually go through two to three generations per year and hibernate as adults from October to April.

In mild-winter locations spined soldier bugs can be active throughout the year. Where winters are cold, adults overwinter in protected places, such as crevices of bark and in organic litter or other debris on the ground.

=== Economic importance ===
The spined soldier bug is a generalist predator that feeds on a wide range of insects, including many major crop pests—over 90 species across eight insect orders. Some of its common prey include the larvae of the Mexican bean beetle, European corn borer, diamondback moth, corn earworm, and Colorado potato beetle. When insect prey is scarce, it may feed on plant juices, though this does not seem to harm plants.

This bug is commonly found in various crops, such as alfalfa, apples, beans, celery, cotton, cucumbers, eggplant, onions, potatoes, soybeans, and tomatoes. Because of its effectiveness in controlling pests, P. maculiventris has been introduced in biological control programs outside North America, including eastern Europe and Russia. Its eggs are also sold commercially for pest control, particularly in heated greenhouses in Europe and North America. However, large-scale field use is often impractical due to the cost of mass production, and wild populations are usually not large enough to fully control pest outbreaks in the spring. To address this, pheromones have been used to attract and concentrate natural populations in target crops.

The spined soldier bug is a highly effective predator, with individual bugs recorded consuming over 100 late-instar fall armyworm larvae in a single season. In Washington potato fields, large-scale releases of P. maculiventris, along with twospotted stink bugs, have reduced Colorado potato beetle infestations by up to 50%. While the species is sold commercially to control Mexican bean beetles, its effectiveness against this pest has yet to be confirmed in large-scale trials. To support its use in pest management, a commercially available pheromone has been developed to attract spined soldier bugs to crops. However, research has shown that P. maculiventris is more vulnerable than some of its prey to organophosphorous and carbamate insecticides, though it is less affected by pyrethroids. Certain insecticides, like diafenthiuron and diflubenzuron, are not highly toxic through residual contact but can be harmful when ingested in water. Additionally, pyriproxyfen and imidacloprid have been found to cause significant mortality in spined soldier bug populations, regardless of how exposure occurs.

== Etymology ==
Podisus maculiventris (Say, 1832) gets its name from the Latin word maculiventris, meaning "spotted belly," which refers to the ventral pattern found in females.
