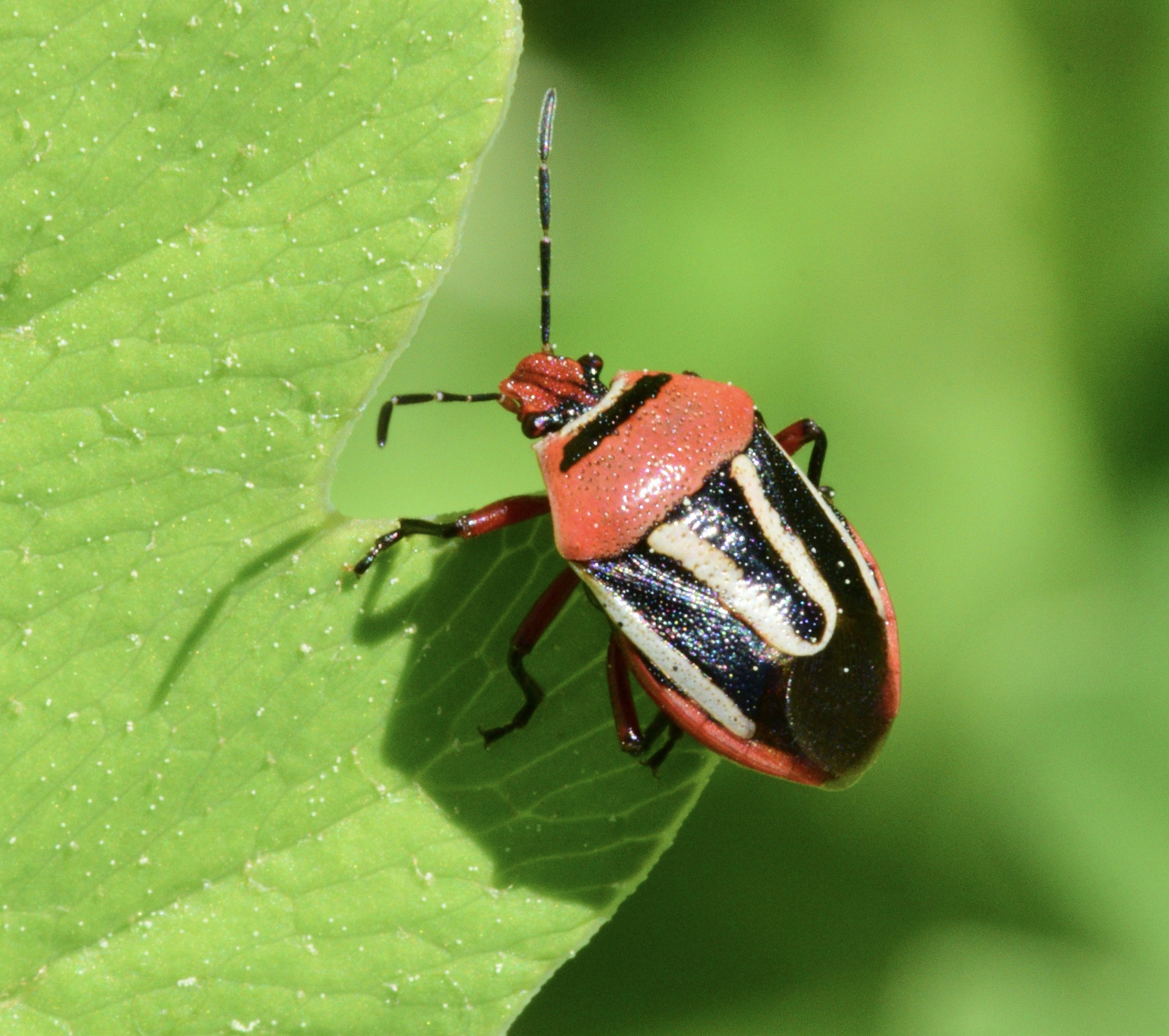

Scientific classification
- Domain: Eukaryota
- Kingdom: Animalia
- Phylum: Arthropoda
- Class: Insecta
- Order: Hemiptera
- Suborder: Heteroptera
- Family: Pentatomidae
- Genus: Perillus
- Species: P. exaptus

Binomial name
- Perillus exaptus (Say, 1825)

= Perillus exaptus =

Species of true bug

Perillus exaptus is a species of predatory stink bug in the family Pentatomidae. It is found in North America.
