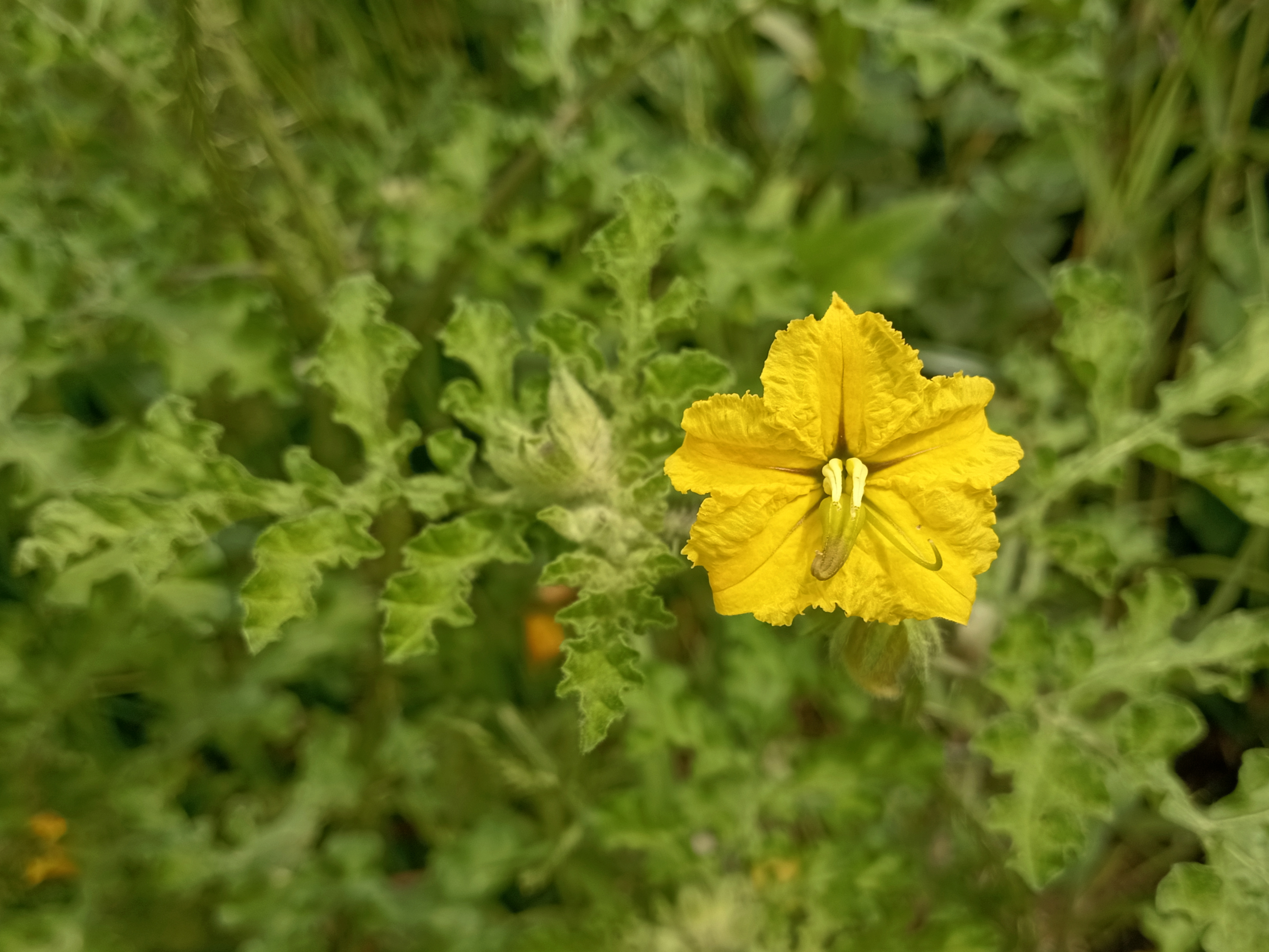

Conservation status
- Secure (NatureServe)

Scientific classification
- Kingdom: Plantae
- Clade: Tracheophytes
- Clade: Angiosperms
- Clade: Eudicots
- Clade: Asterids
- Order: Solanales
- Family: Solanaceae
- Genus: Solanum
- Subgenus: Solanum subg. Leptostemonum
- Section: Solanum sect. Crinitum
- Species: S. rostratum

Binomial name
- Solanum rostratum Dunal

Synonyms
- Solanum cornutum auct.

= Solanum rostratum =

Species of flowering plant

Solanum rostratum is a species of nightshade (genus Solanum) that is native to the United States and northern and central Mexico. Common names include buffalobur nightshade, buffalo-bur, spiny nightshade, Colorado bur, Kansas thistle, bad woman, Mexican thistle, and Texas thistle.

It is an annual, self-compatible herb that forms a tumbleweed. Individual plants reach 1–1.5 m (3.3–4.9 ft) tall, have once or twice pinnatified leaves (see image of leaf), and abundant spines on the stems and leaves. It produces yellow flowers with pentagonal corollas 2–3.5 cm (0.79–1.38 in) in diameter and weakly bilaterally symmetric (see flower-closeup image). In its native range S. rostratum is pollinated by medium- to large-sized bees including bumblebees.

Solanum rostratum flowers exhibit heteranthery, i.e. they bear two sets of anthers of unequal size, possibly distinct colouration, and divergence in ecological function between pollination and feeding. The fruit, a berry, is enclosed by a prickly calyx. The seeds are released when the berries dry and dehisce (split apart) while still attached to the plant.

This species represents one of the later scientific interests of famed biologist Charles Darwin, who just over a week prior to his death had ordered seeds from a colleague in America, so as to investigate their heteranthery, a topic he was interested in.

Solanum rostratum is the ancestral host plant of the Colorado potato beetle, Leptinotarsa decemlineata, but this pest adopted the potato, Solanum tuberosum as a new (and more succulent) host, a fact first reported in eastern Nebraska in 1859. It then expanded its range rapidly eastward on potato crops in the next two decades. Can be invasive.

== Gallery ==
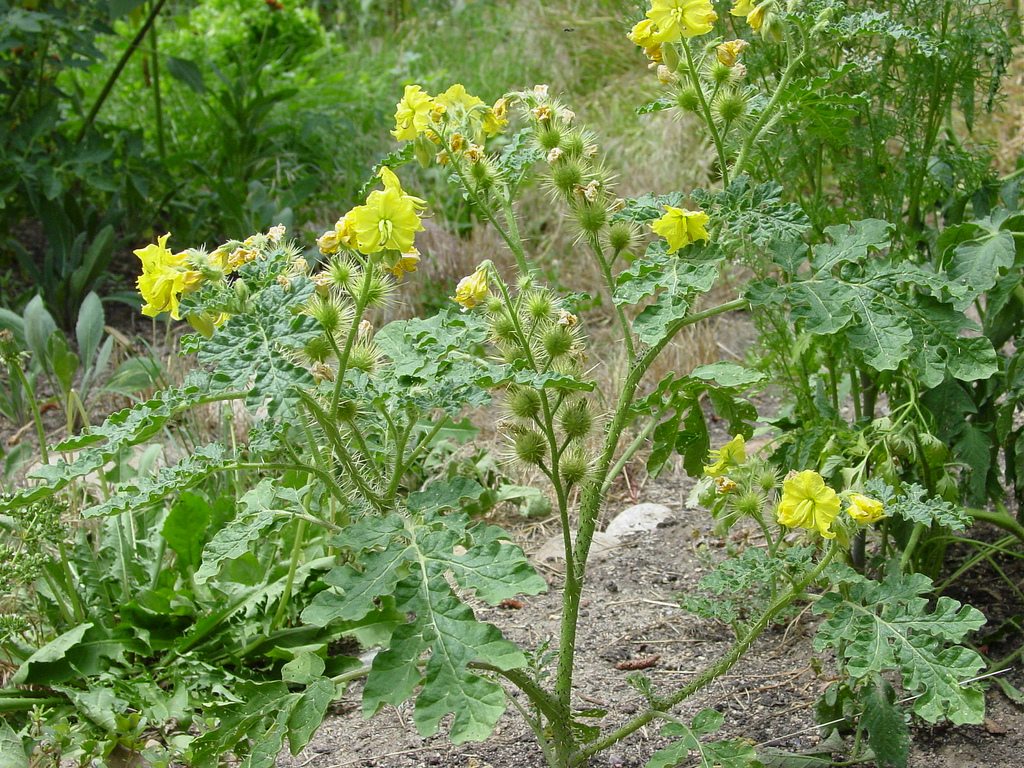
S. rostratum

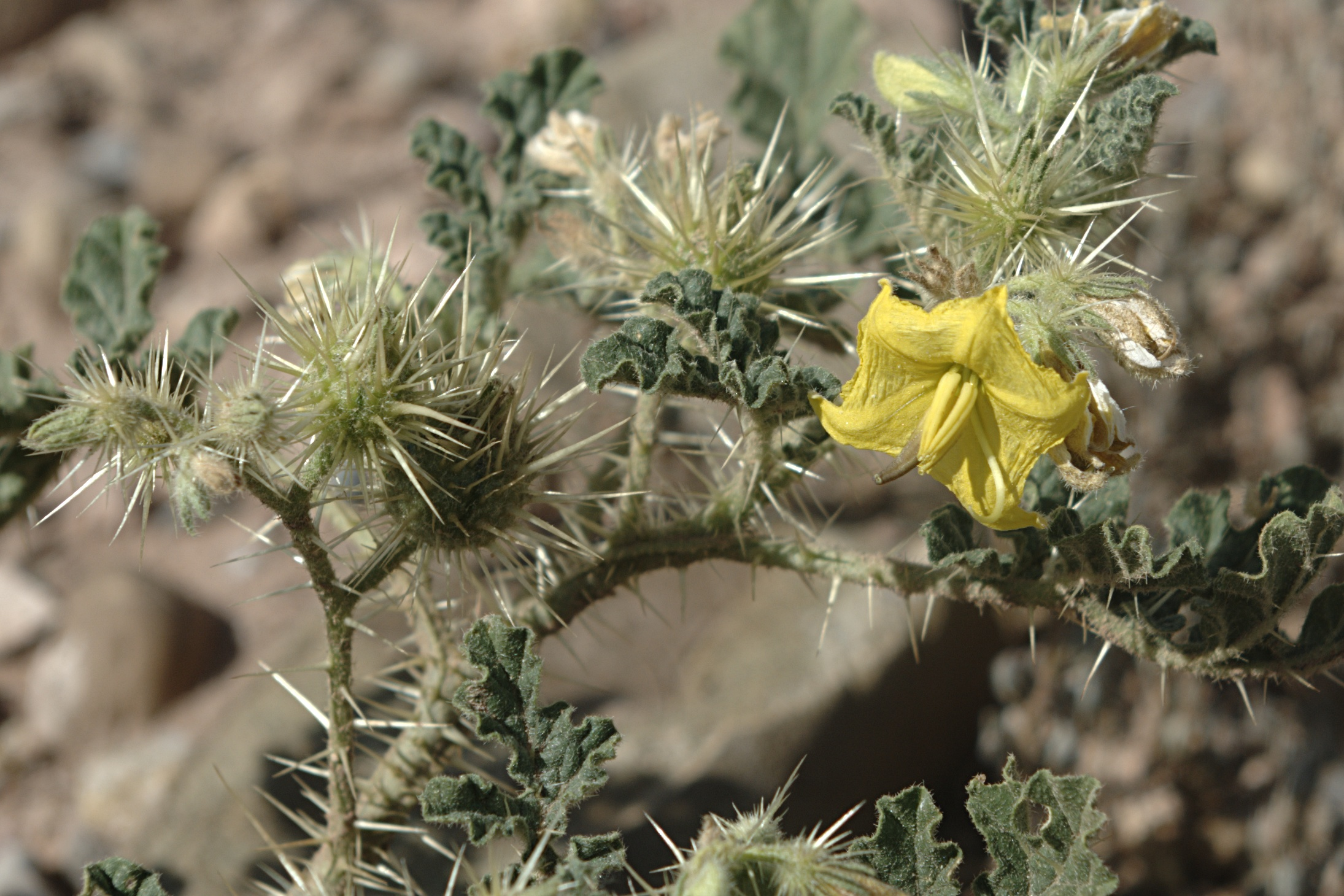
Detail

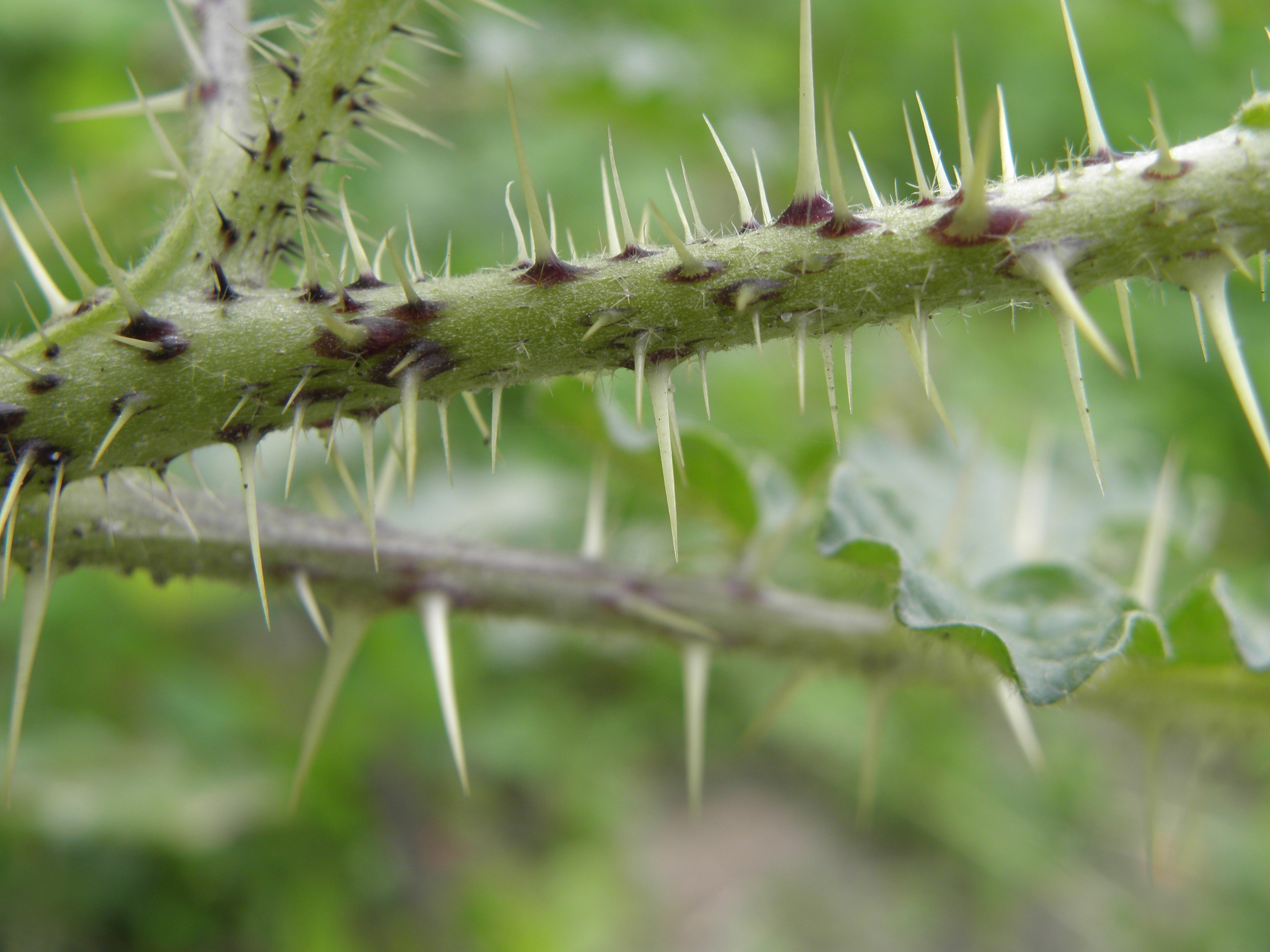
Stem

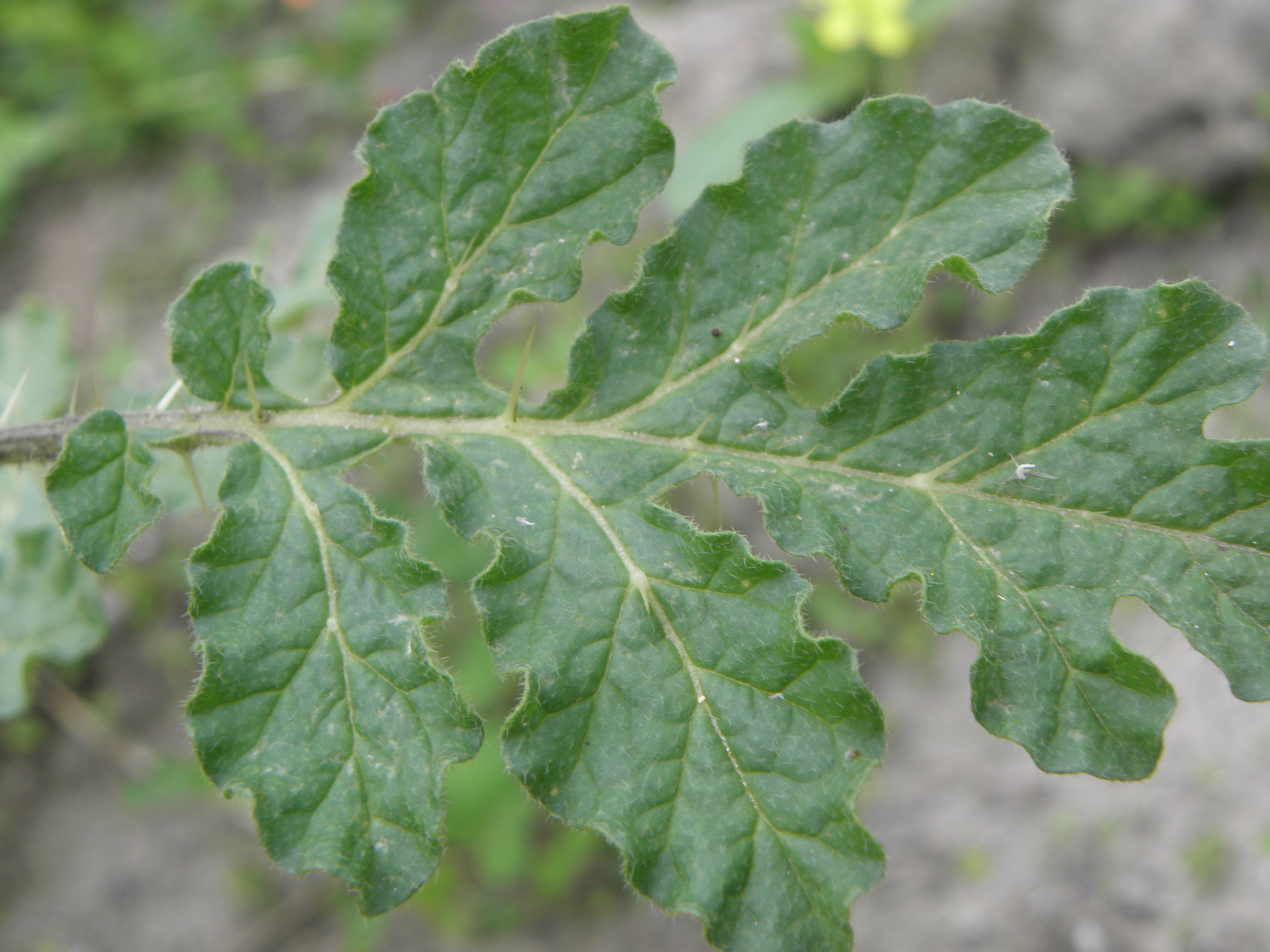
Leaf

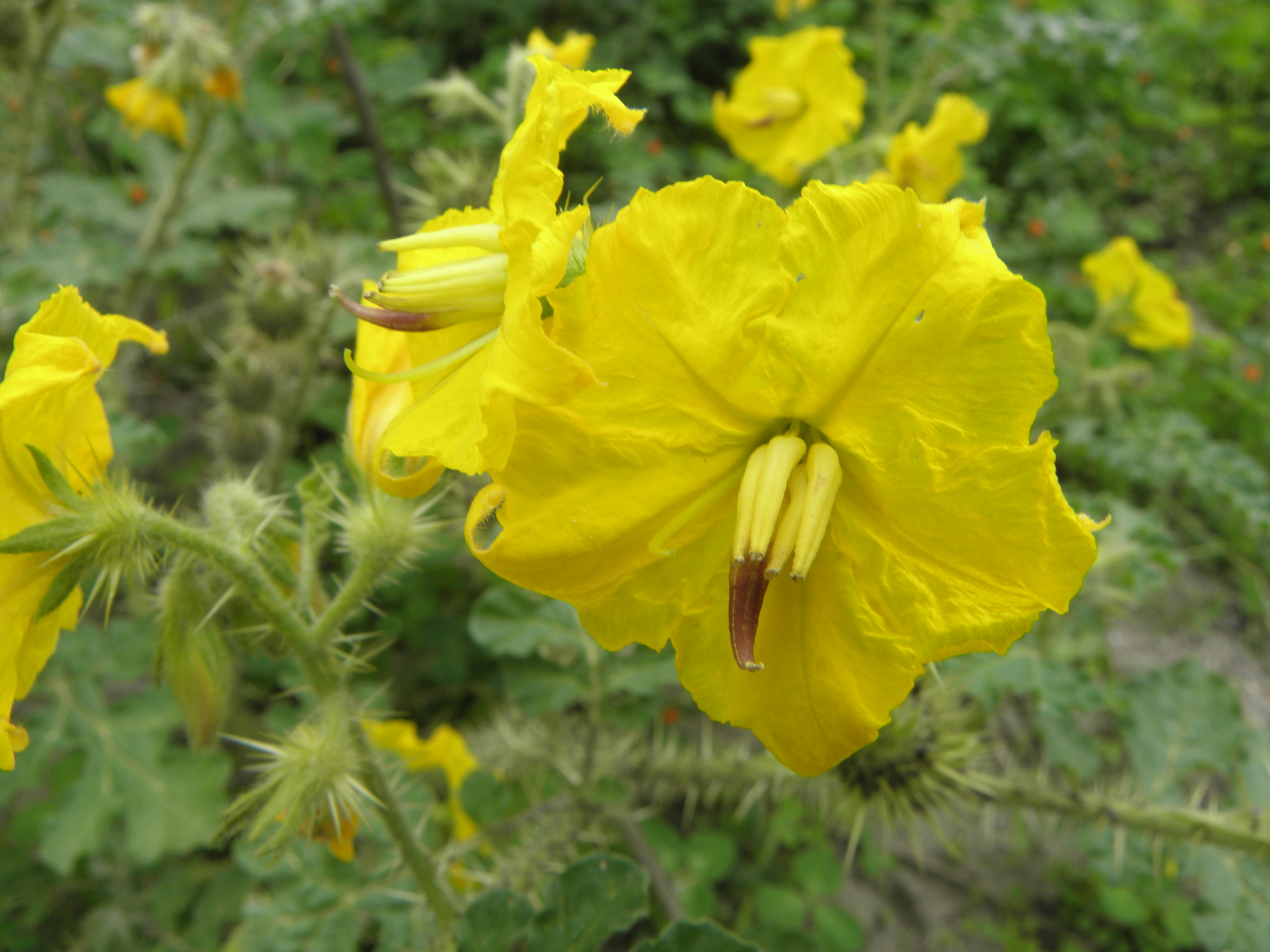
Flowers

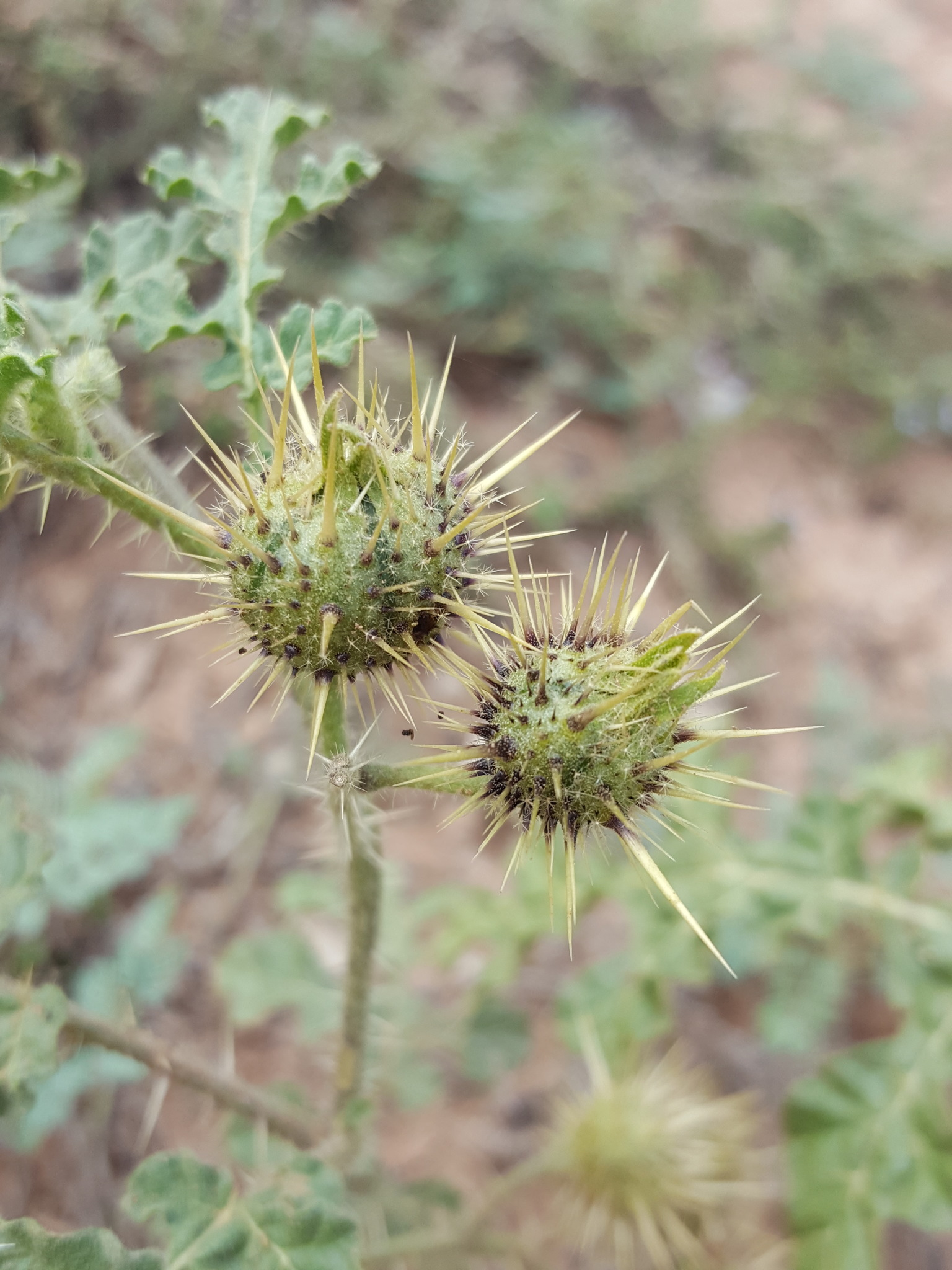
Fruits

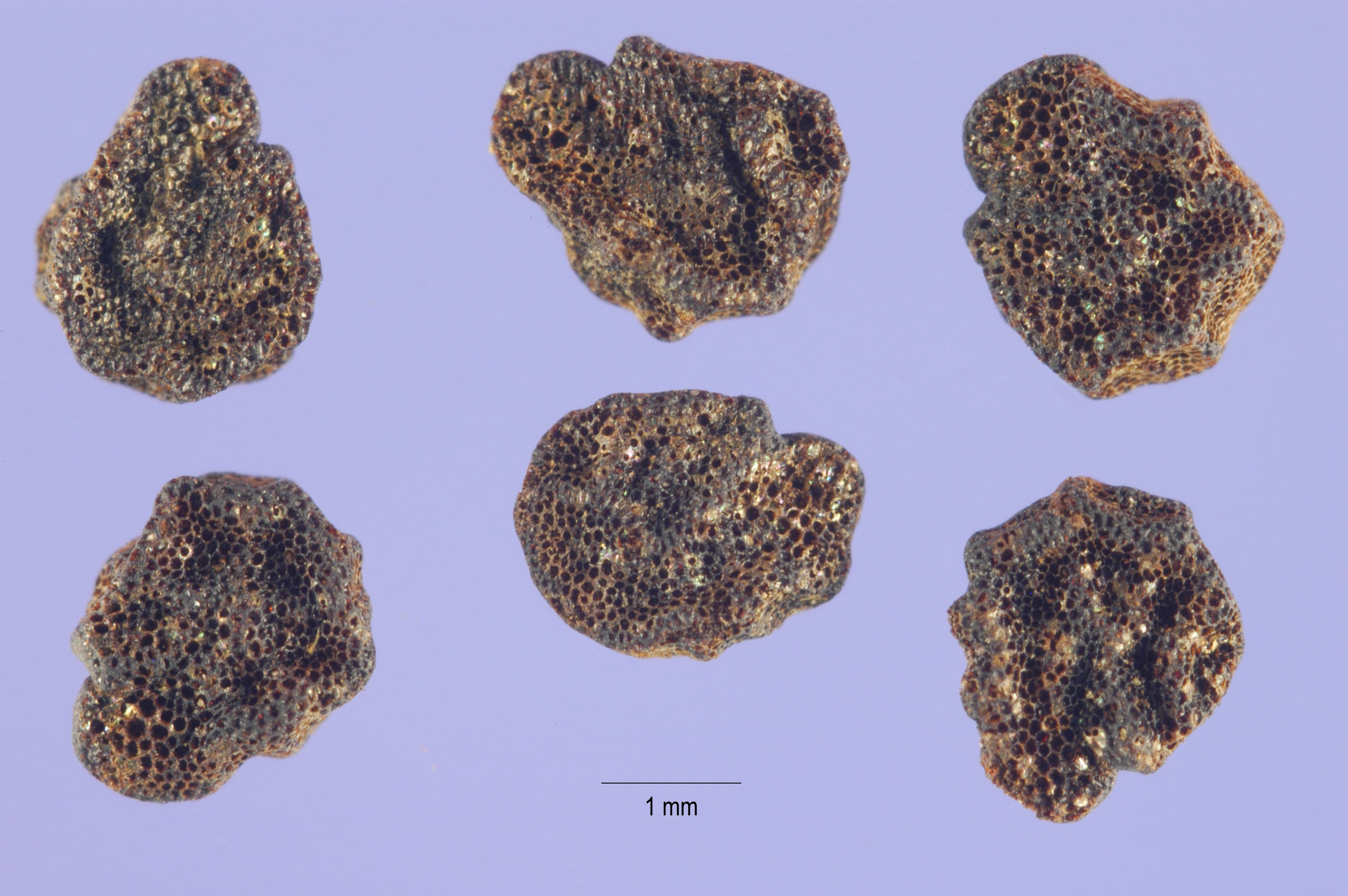
Seeds
