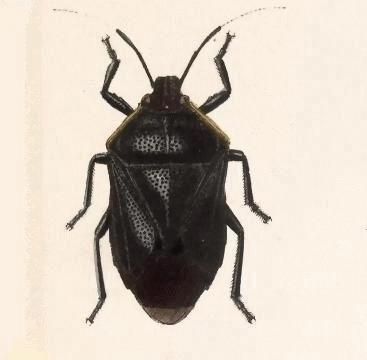
- Perillus circumcinctus

Scientific classification
- Kingdom: Animalia
- Phylum: Arthropoda
- Class: Insecta
- Order: Hemiptera
- Suborder: Heteroptera
- Family: Pentatomidae
- Subfamily: Asopinae
- Genus: Perillus; Stål, 1862

Synonyms
- Mineus Stål, 1867; Perilloides Schouteden, 1907

= Perillus =

Genus of true bugs

Perillus is a genus of predatory stink bugs in the family Pentatomidae. There are about seven described species in Perillus.

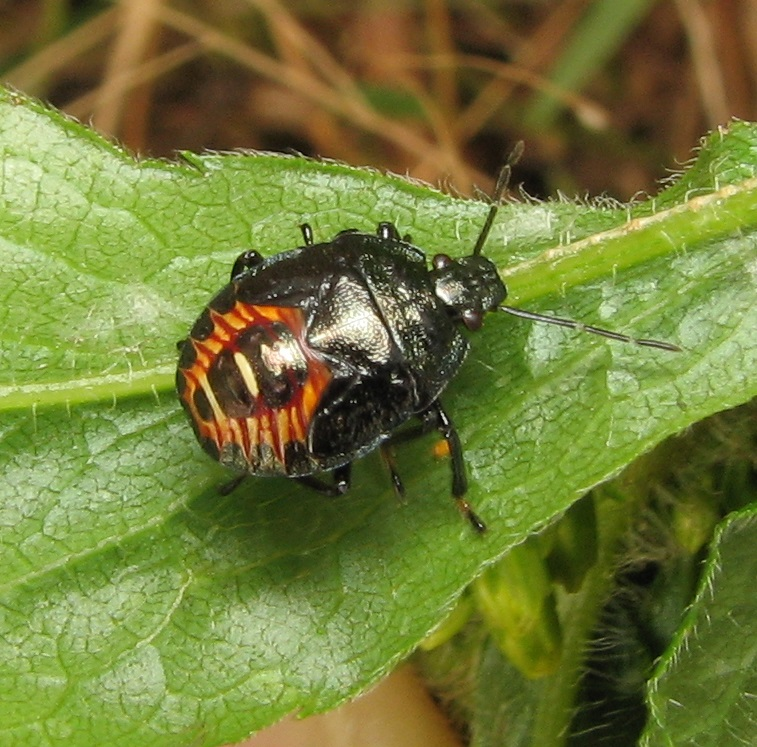
Perillus sp. nymph

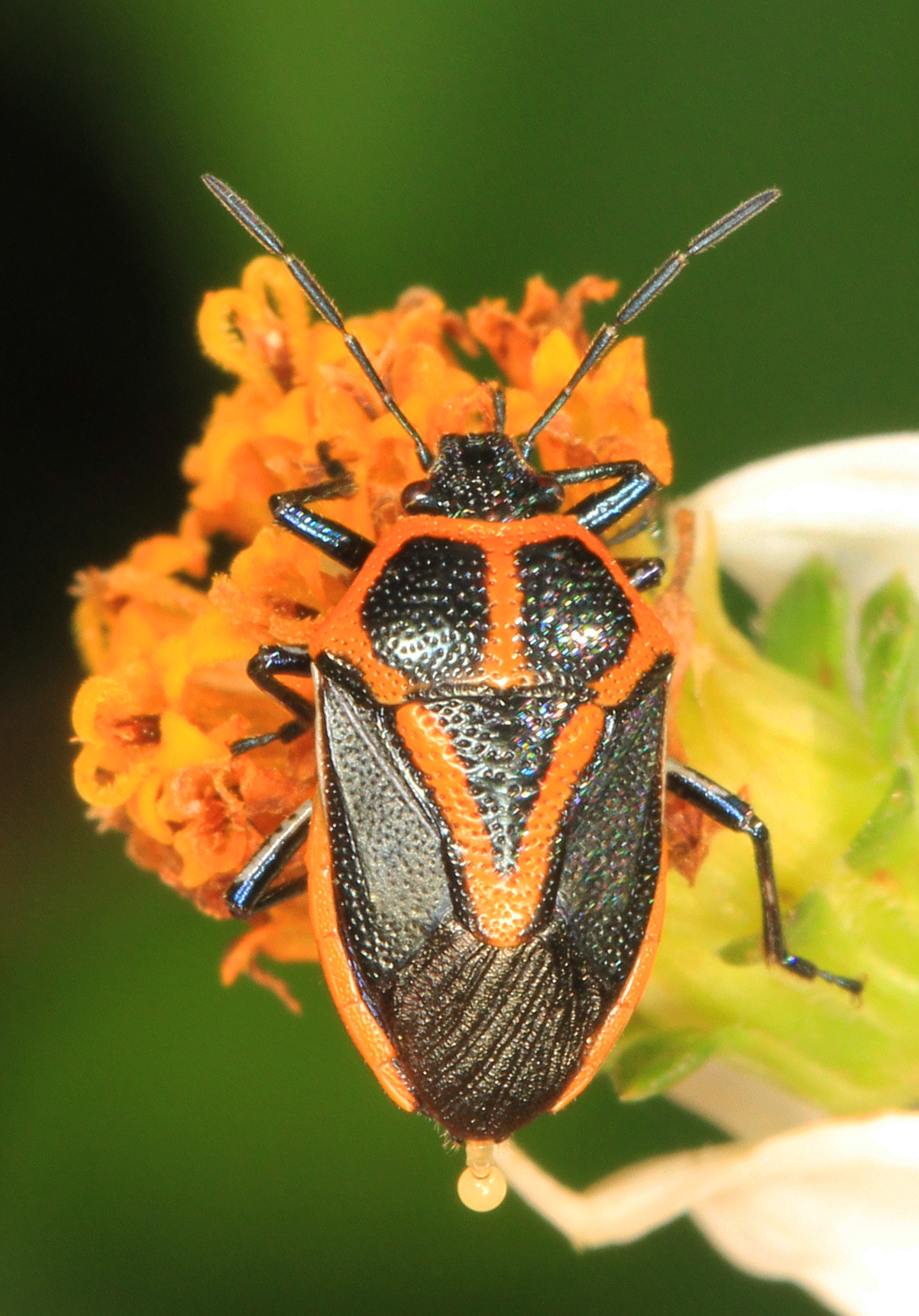
Perillus strigipes

== Species ==
These seven species belong to the genus Perillus:

- Perillus bioculatus (Fabricius, 1775)^{i c g b} (two-spotted stink bug)
- Perillus circumcinctus Stal, 1862^{i c g b}
- Perillus confluens (Herrich-schaeffer, 1839)^{i c g b}
- Perillus exaptus (Say, 1825)^{i c g b}
- Perillus lunatus Knight, 1952^{i c g}
- Perillus splendidus (Uhler, 1861)^{i c g b}
- Perillus strigipes (Herrich-Schaeffer, 1853)^{i c g b}

Data sources: i = ITIS, c = Catalogue of Life, g = GBIF, b = Bugguide.net
