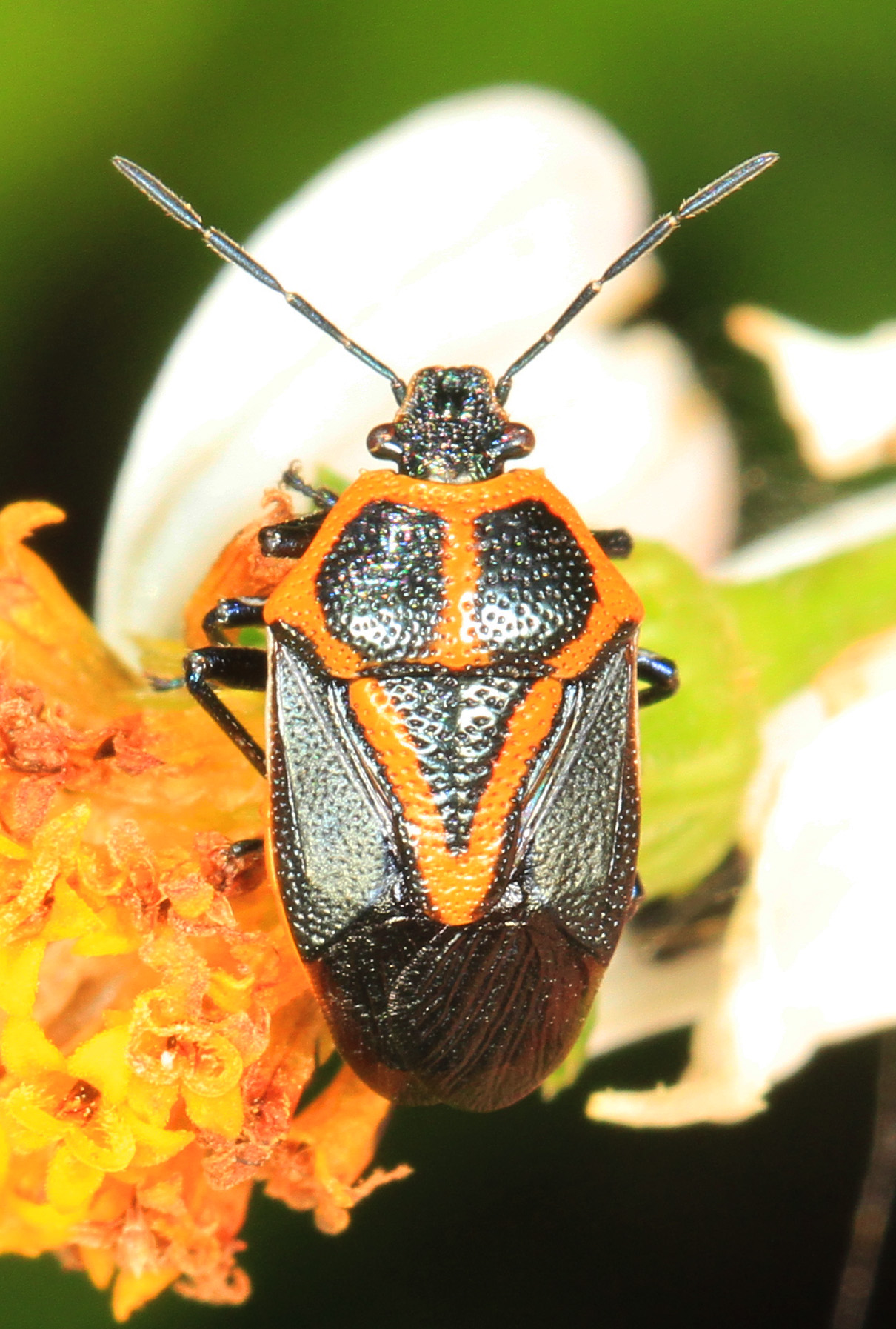

Scientific classification
- Domain: Eukaryota
- Kingdom: Animalia
- Phylum: Arthropoda
- Class: Insecta
- Order: Hemiptera
- Suborder: Heteroptera
- Family: Pentatomidae
- Genus: Perillus
- Species: P. strigipes

Binomial name
- Perillus strigipes (Herrich-Schaeffer, 1853)

Synonyms
- Podisus strigipes Herrich-Schaeffer, 1853

= Perillus strigipes =

Species of true bug

Perillus strigipes is a species of predatory stink bug in the family Pentatomidae. It is found in North America.

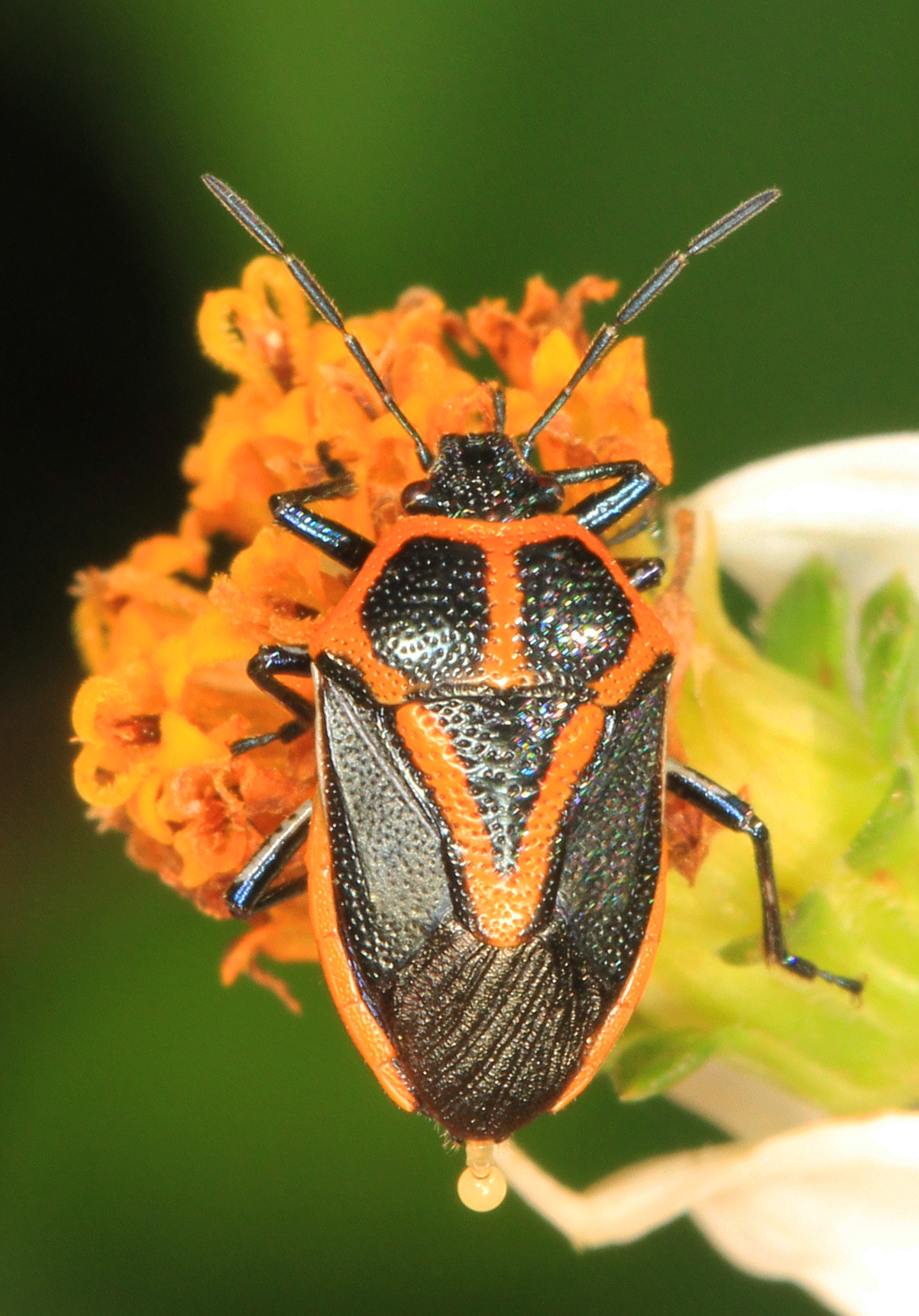
