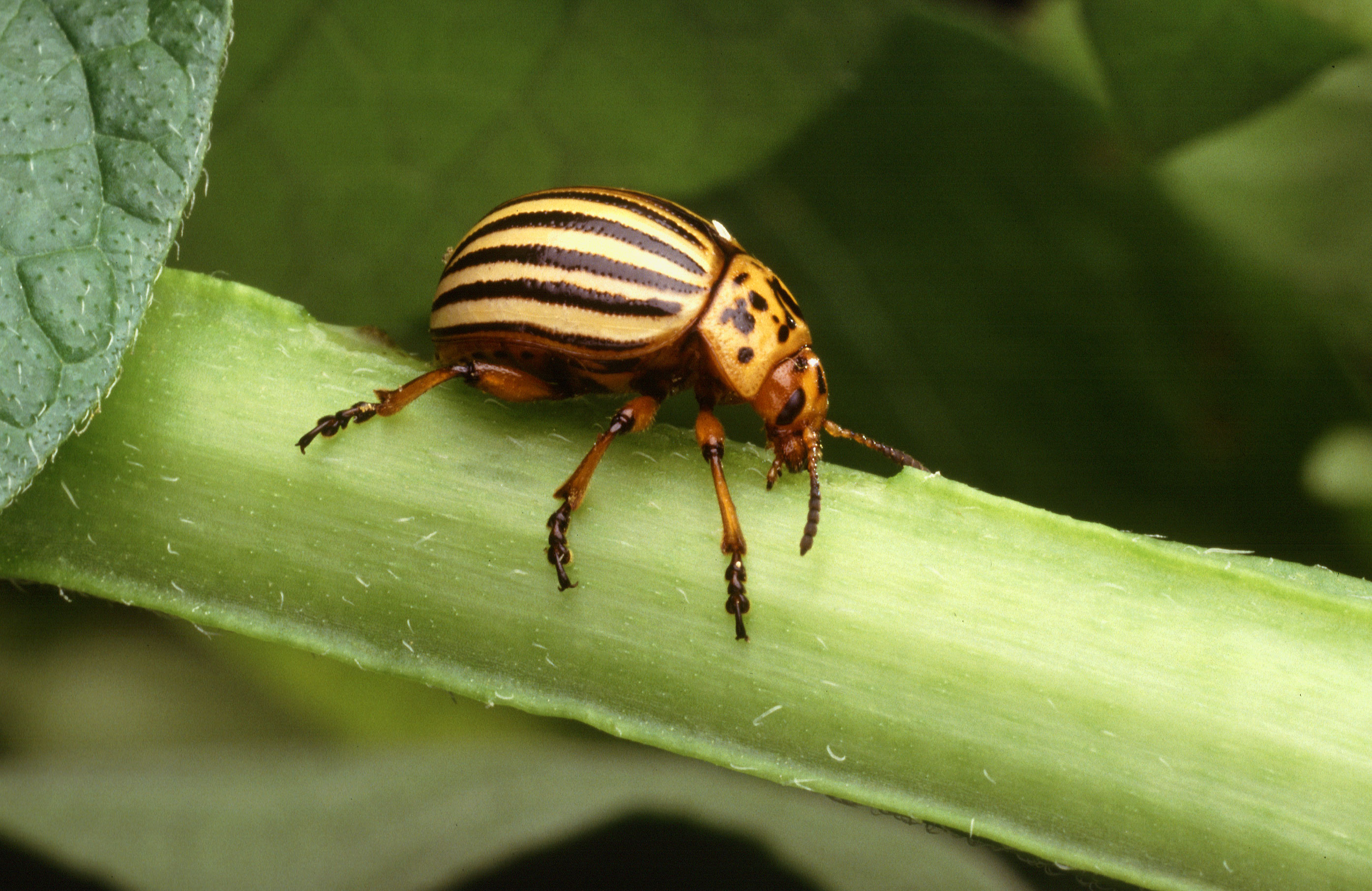

Scientific classification
- Kingdom: Animalia
- Phylum: Arthropoda
- Clade: Pancrustacea
- Class: Insecta
- Order: Coleoptera
- Suborder: Polyphaga
- Infraorder: Cucujiformia
- Family: Chrysomelidae
- Genus: Leptinotarsa
- Species: L. decemlineata

Binomial name
- Leptinotarsa decemlineata (Say, 1824)

Synonyms
- Doryphora decemlineata Say, 1824; Stilodes decemlineata (Say, 1824)

= Colorado potato beetle =

Species of beetle

The Colorado potato beetle (Leptinotarsa decemlineata; also known as the Colorado beetle, the ten-striped spearman, the ten-lined potato beetle, and the potato bug) is a beetle known for being a major pest of potato crops. It is about 10 mm (3/8 in) long, with a bright yellow/orange body and five bold brown stripes along the length of each of its wings. Native to the Rocky Mountains, it spread rapidly in potato crops across the United States and then Europe from 1859 onwards.

The Colorado potato beetle was first observed in 1811 by Thomas Nuttall and was formally described in 1824 by American entomologist Thomas Say. The beetles were collected in the Rocky Mountains, where they were feeding on the buffalo bur, Solanum rostratum.

== Description ==
Adult beetles typically are 6–11 mm (0.24–0.43 in) in length and 3 mm (0.12 in) in width. They weigh 50–170 mg. The beetles are orange-yellow in color with 10 characteristic black stripes on their front wings or elytra. The specific name decemlineata, meaning "ten-lined", derives from this feature.

Adult beetles may be visually confused with L. juncta, which is the false potato beetle. Unlike the Colorado potato beetle, it is not an agricultural pest. L. juncta also has alternating black and white strips on its back, but one of the white strips in the center of each wing cover is missing and replaced by a light brown strip.

=== Larvae ===
The orange-pink larvae have a large, 9-segmented abdomen, black head, and prominent spiracles, and may measure up to 15 mm (0.59 in) in length in their final instar stage.

The beetle larva has four instar stages. The head remains black throughout these stages, but the pronotum changes color from black in first- and second-instar larvae to having an orange-brown edge in its third-instar. In fourth-instar larvae, about half the pronotum is colored light brown. This tribe is characterized within the subfamily by round to oval-shaped convex bodies, which are usually brightly colored, simple claws which separate at the base, open cavities behind the procoxae, and a variable apical segment of the maxillary palp.

== Distribution ==
The beetle is most likely native to the area between Colorado and northern Mexico and was discovered in 1824 by Thomas Say in the Rocky Mountains. It is found in North America and is present in every state and province except Alaska, California, Hawaii and Nevada. It now has a wide distribution across Europe and Asia, totaling more than 16 million km^{2}.

Its first association with the potato plant (Solanum tuberosum) was not made until about 1859, when it began destroying potato crops in the region of Omaha, Nebraska. Its spread eastward was rapid, at an average distance of 140 km per year. The beetle has the potential to spread to temperate areas of East Asia, India, South America, Africa, New Zealand and Australia.

=== Human interaction ===
By 1874 it had reached the Atlantic Coast. From 1871 American entomologist Charles Valentine Riley warned Europeans about the potential for an accidental infestation caused by the transport of the beetle from America. From 1875 several Western European countries, including Germany, Belgium, France and Switzerland, banned imports of American potatoes to avoid infestation by L. decemlineata.

These controls proved ineffective, as the beetle soon reached Europe. In 1877 L. decemlineata reached the United Kingdom and was first recorded from Liverpool docks, but it did not become established. Many further outbreaks have occurred; the species has been eradicated in the UK at least 163 times. The last major outbreak was in 1977. It remains as a notifiable quarantine pest in the United Kingdom and is monitored by the Plant Health and Seeds Inspectorate of the Animal and Plant Health Agency (APHA) to prevent it from becoming established. A cost-benefit analysis from 1981 suggested that the cost of the measures used to exclude L. decemlineata from the UK was less than the likely costs of control if it became established. In July 2023 Colorado beetles were officially confirmed in a potato field in Kent, England. Farmers and growers, gardeners and members of the public were being encouraged to remain vigilant for signs of the pest and to report potential sightings to APHA. In January 2026 it was reported that beetle had once again been eradicated from the UK.

Elsewhere in Europe the beetle became established near USA military bases in Bordeaux during or immediately following World War I and had proceeded to spread by the beginning of World War II to Belgium, the Netherlands and Spain. The population increased dramatically during and immediately following World War II and spread eastward, and the beetle is now found over much of the continent. After World War II, in the Soviet occupation zone of Germany, almost half of all potato fields were infested by the beetle by 1950. In East Germany they were known as Amikäfer ('Yankee beetles') following a governmental claim that the beetles were dropped by American planes. In the European Union it remains a regulated (quarantine) pest for the Republic of Ireland, Balearic Islands, Cyprus, Malta and southern parts of Sweden and Finland. It is not established in any of these member states, but occasional infestations can occur when, for example, wind blows adults from Russia to Finland.

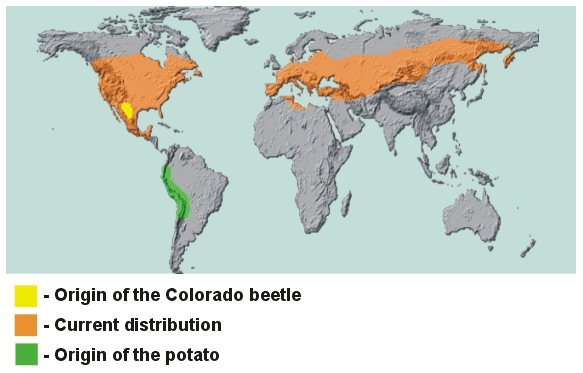
Native range of the potato and native and current range of the Colorado beetle

Expansion of the Colorado potato beetle's range in North America, 1859–1876

Expansion of the Colorado potato beetle's range in Europe, 1921–1964

== Lifecycle ==
Colorado potato beetle females are very prolific and are capable of laying over 500 eggs in a 4- to 5-week period. The eggs are yellow to orange, and are about 1 mm (0.039 in) long. They are usually deposited in batches of about 30 eggs on the underside of host leaves. Development of all life stages depends on temperature.

After 4–15 days, the eggs hatch into reddish-brown larvae with humped backs and two rows of dark brown spots, one row on each side. They feed on the leaves of their host plants. Larvae progress through four distinct growth stages (instars). First instars measure about 1.50 mm (0.059 in) long, and the last (fourth) instars about 8 mm (0.31 in) long. The first through third instars each last about 2–3 days; the fourth lasts 4–7 days.

Upon reaching full size, each fourth instar spends several days as a nonfeeding prepupa, which can be recognized by its inactivity and lighter coloration. The prepupae drop to the soil and burrow to a depth of several inches, then pupate. In 5 to 10 days, the adult beetle emerges to feed and mate. This beetle can thus go from egg to adult in as little as 21 days. Depending on temperature, light conditions, and host quality, the adults may enter diapause and delay emergence until spring. They then return to their host plants to mate and feed; overwintering adults may begin mating within 24 hours of spring emergence. In some locations, three or more generations may occur each growing season.

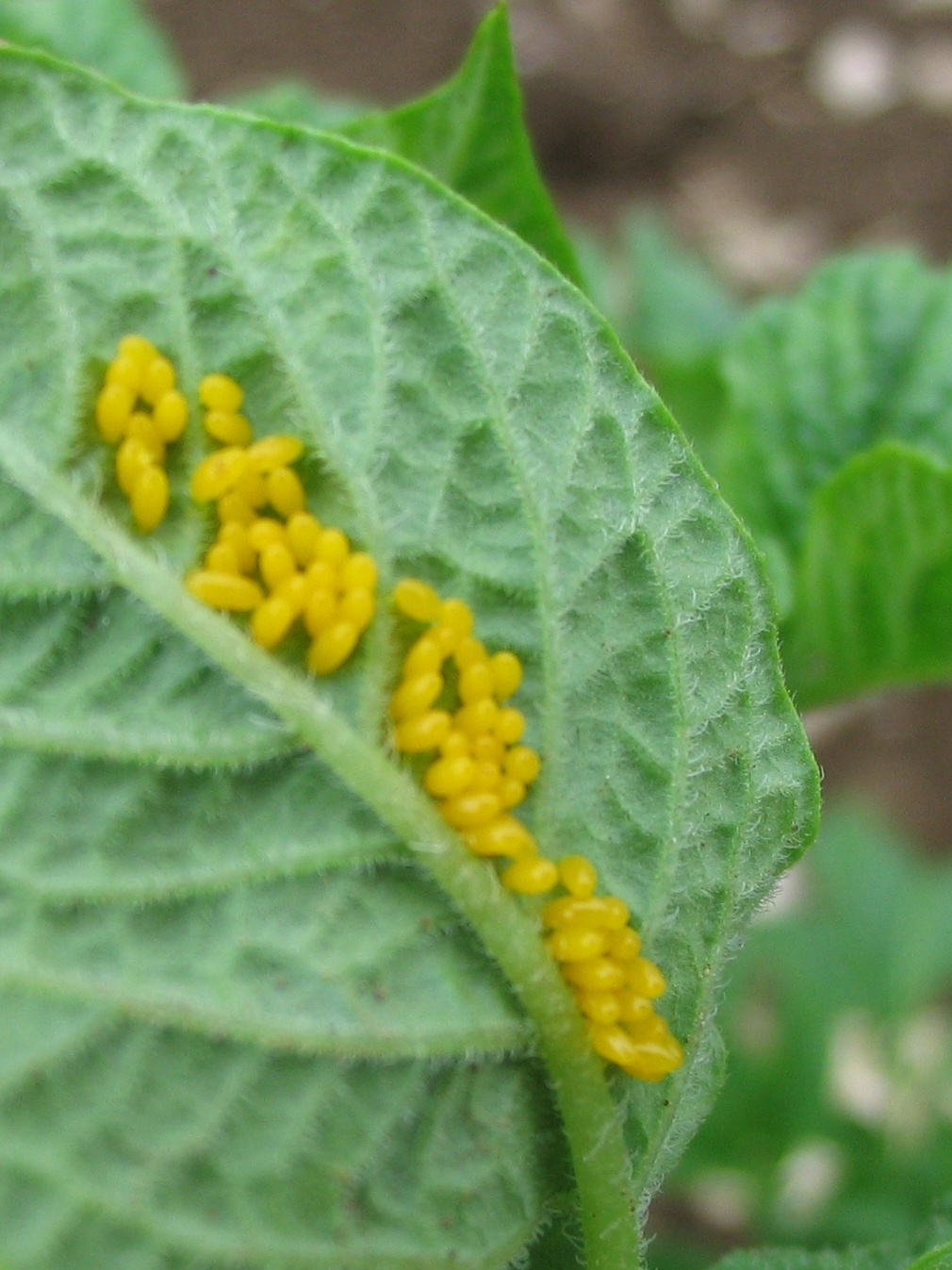
Eggs laid on the underside of a leaf

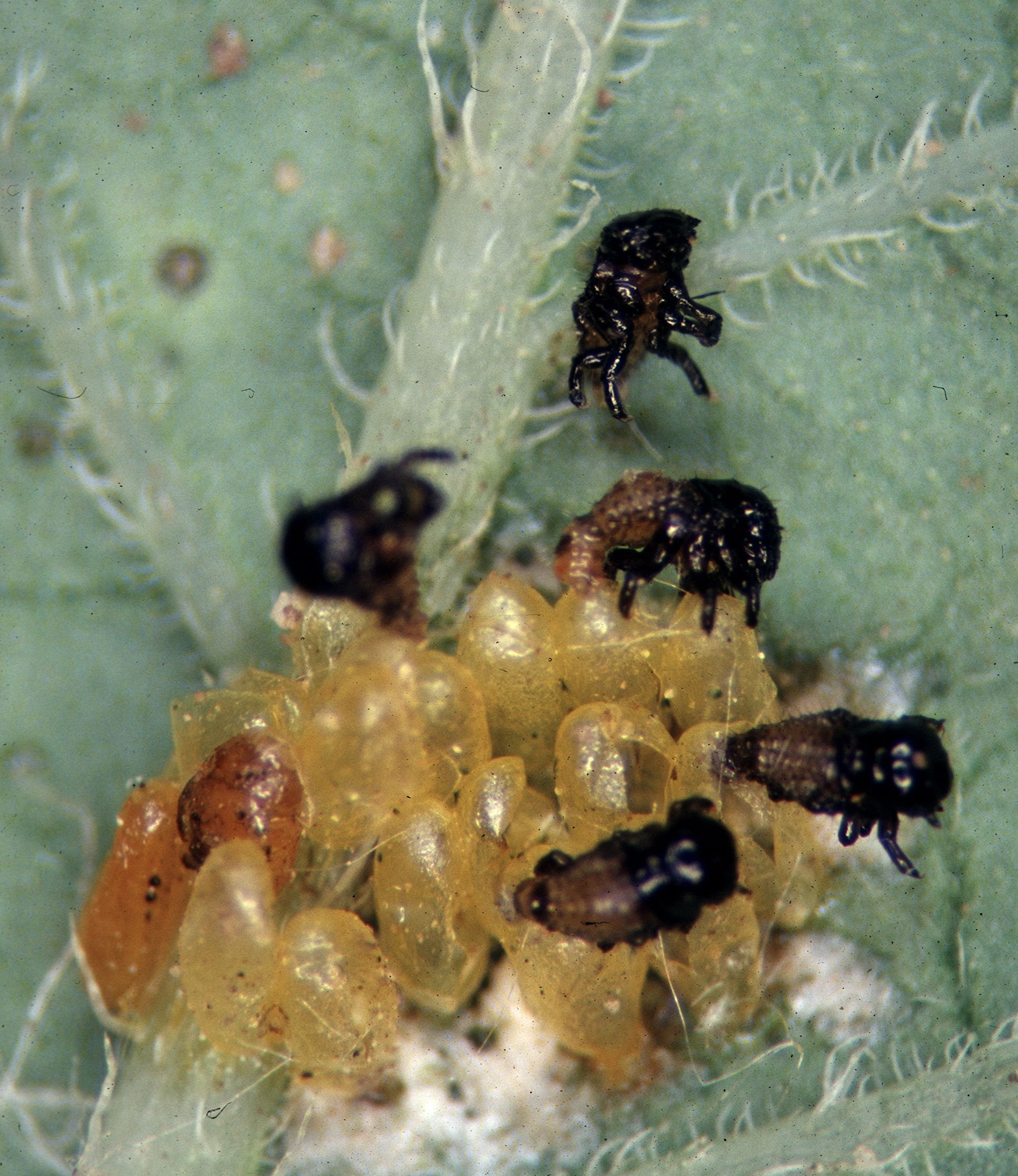
1st instar larva after hatching

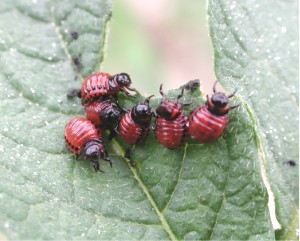
3rd instar stage of larvae

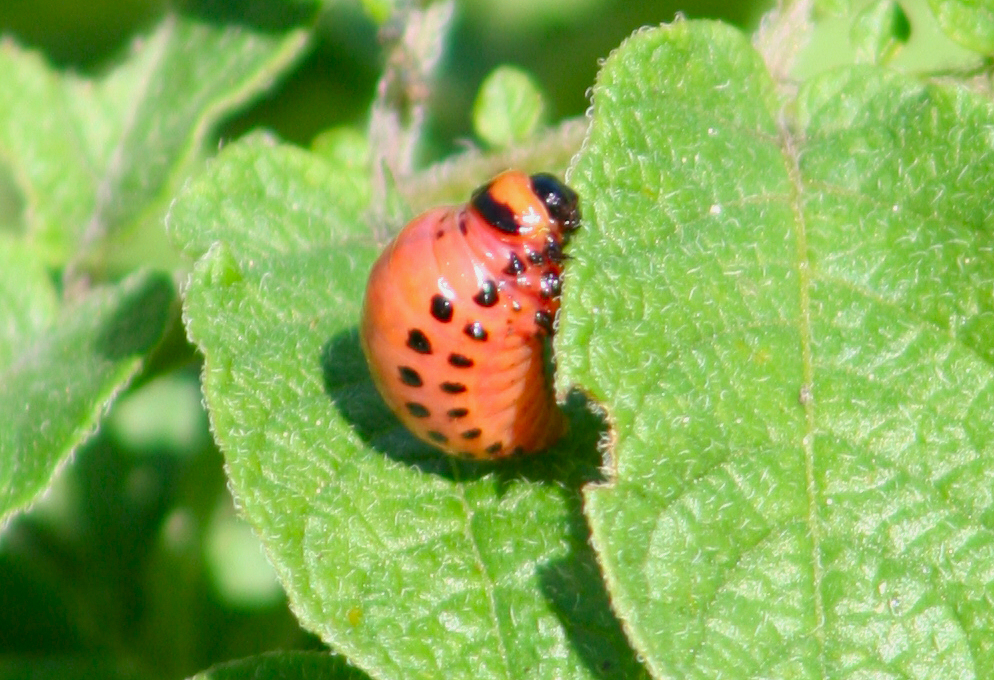
4th instar stage of larva, before pupation

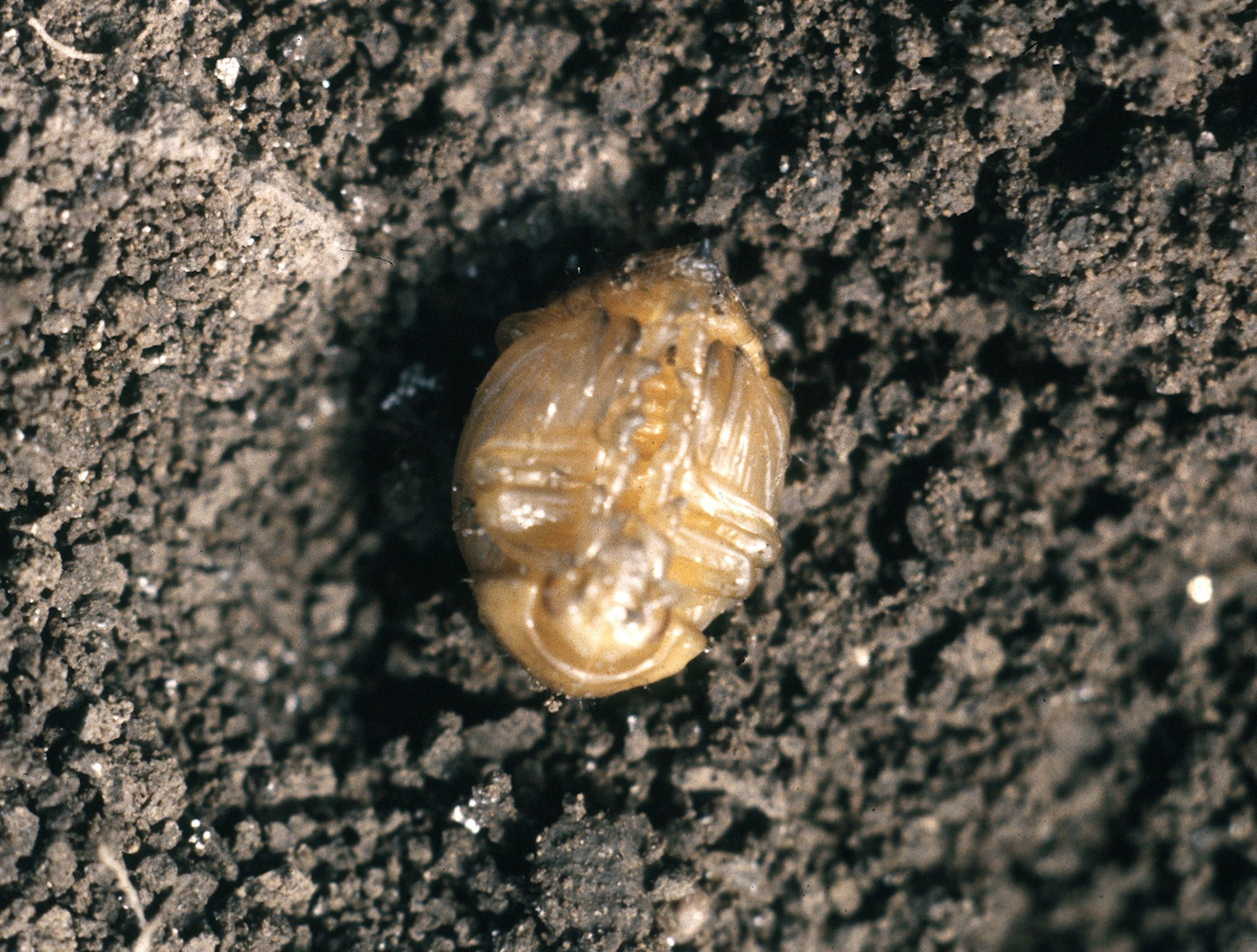
Pupa

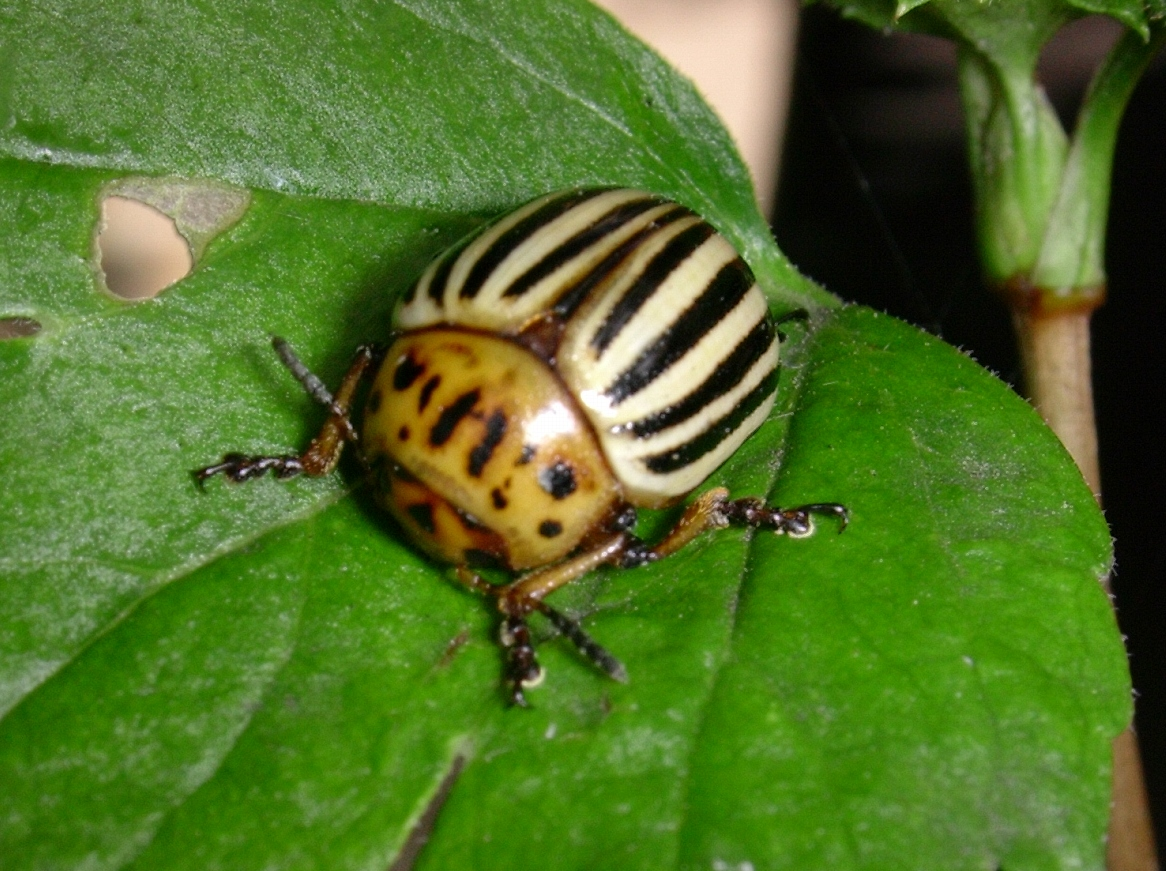
Adult beetle after emergence

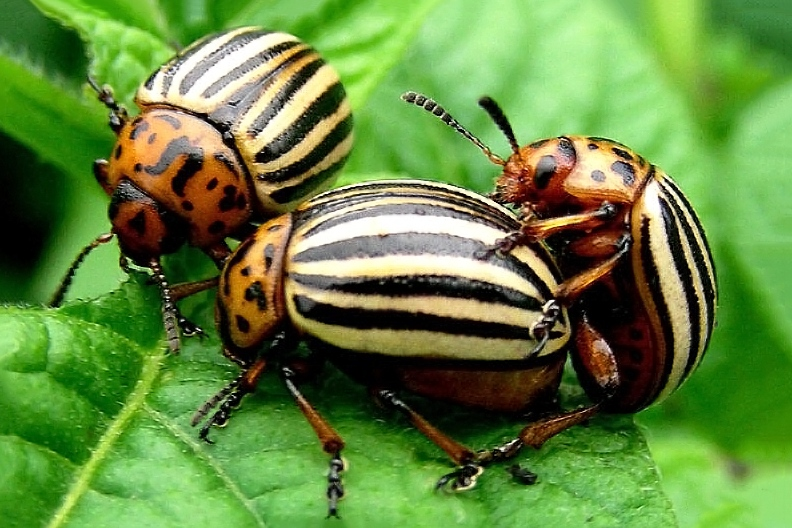
Mating adult beetles

=== Mate and host searching ===
Visual cues are important for Colorado potato beetles during the mate and host search. In a study done by Szentsi, Weber, and Jermy in the paper Role of visual stimuli in host and mate location of the Colorado potato beetle, the beetles' attraction to boards with different spectral bands, reaction to beetle-sized stationary objects, responses to such objects on boards, and attraction to prior female substances were investigated. The researchers' hypothesis was that experience with female substances would cause behavior changes in males. When shown colored boards, the beetles had a positive response between 45° and 0° in terms of mean angular directions (MADs). Beads and dead beetles without boards evoked a weaker response with MADs being variable. Colored boards and bead combinations displayed more positive MADs responses between 45° and 0°. Experience with female substances showed that male beetles showed high responses to female scent. According to the study, 43 of the 49 runs where female smear was used had a response score of 5 in contrast to the 23/42 runs without female smear receiving a score of 5.

Colorado potato beetles are also attracted to the volatiles potato plants emit. In the article Sexual contact influences orientation to plant attractant in Colorado potato beetle, Leptinotarsa decemlineata Say (Coleoptera: Chrysomelidae) by Joseph Dickens, the beetles were attracted to kairomone substance but after mating, their attraction to it reduced. Within 24 hours of mating, there was no difference between levels of attraction to kairomone and control solvent. Lack of attraction occurred for two days but resumed three days after mating. Male beetles produce a pheromone that is further enhanced by plant host volatiles like the kairomone. After a beetle is attracted to the host, mating occurs and the female lays her eggs on the plant. The beetles' attraction to kairomone decreases until 72 hours later once oviposition occurs and the probability of re-mating increases.

== Behavior and ecology ==
=== Diet ===
L. decemlineata has a strong association with plants in the family Solanaceae, particularly those of the genus Solanum. It is directly associated with Solanum cornutum (buffalo-bur), Solanum nigrum (black nightshade), Solanum melongena (eggplant or aubergine), Solanum dulcamara (bittersweet nightshade), Solanum luteum (hairy nightshade), Solanum tuberosum (potato), and Solanum elaeagnifolium (silverleaf nightshade). They are also associated with other plants in this family, namely the species Solanum lycopersicum (tomato) and the genus Capsicum (pepper).

=== Enemies ===
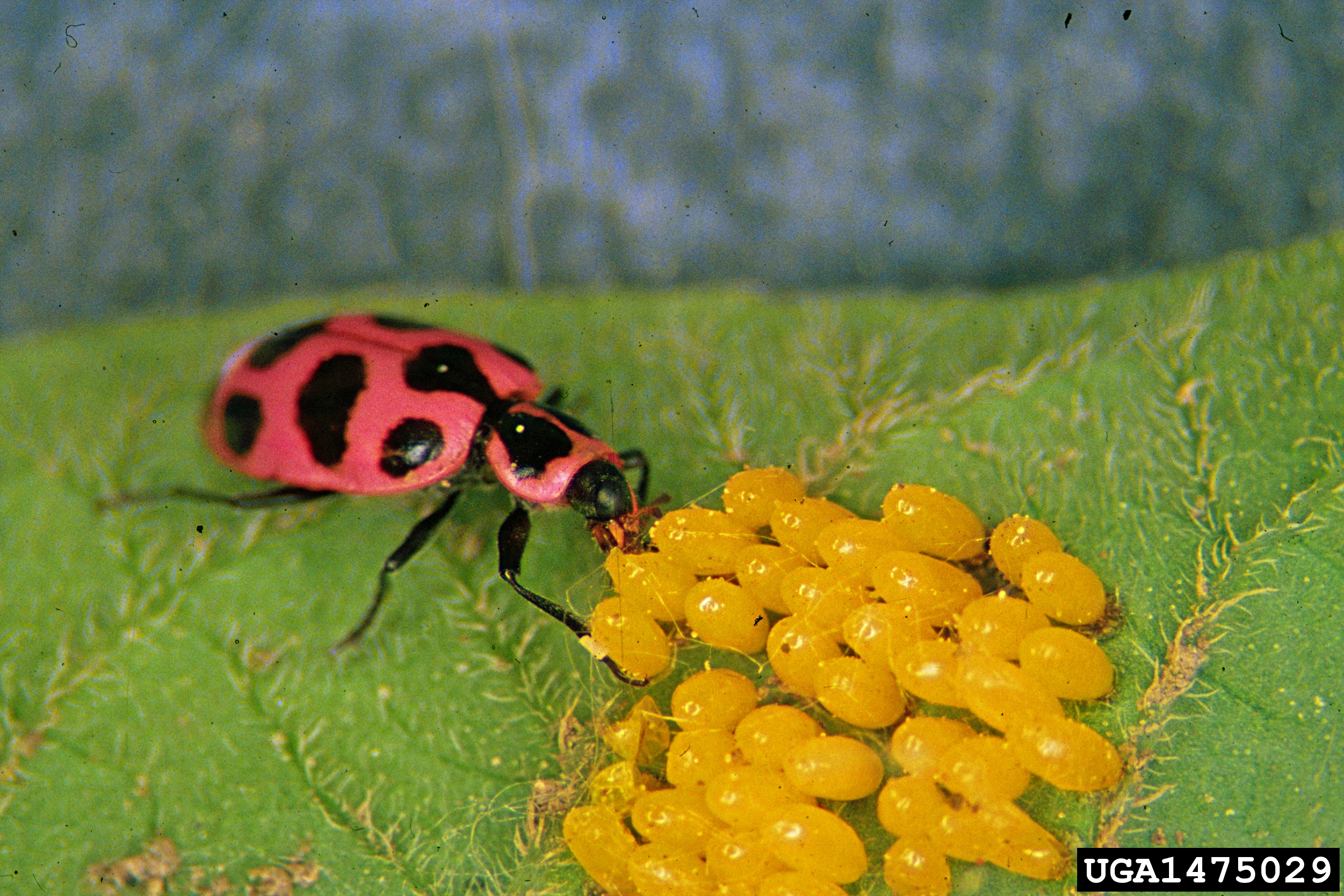
Coleomegilla maculata preying upon Colorado beetle eggs

At least 13 insect genera, three spider families, one phalangid (Opiliones), and one mite have been recorded as either generalist or specialized predators of the varying stages of L. decemlineata. These include the ground beetle Lebia grandis, the coccinellid beetles Coleomegilla maculata and Hippodamia convergens, the shield bugs Perillus bioculatus and Podisus maculiventris, various species of the lacewing genus Chrysopa, the wasp genus Polistes, and the damsel bug genus Nabis.

The predatory ground beetle L. grandis is a predator of both the eggs and larvae of L. decemlineata, and its larvae are parasitoids of the pupae. An adult L. grandis may consume up to 23 eggs or 3.3 larvae in a single day.

In a laboratory experiment, Podisus maculiventris was used as a predatory threat to female L. decemlineata specimens, resulting in the production of unviable trophic eggs alongside viable ones; this response to a predator ensured that additional food was available for newly hatched offspring to increase their survival rate. The same experiment also demonstrated the cannibalism of unhatched eggs by newly hatched L. decemlineata larvae as an antipredator response.

Examples of parasitoids, predators, and pathogens of different life stages of Leptinotarsa decemlineata ^{1}
Type	Species	Order	Predates	Location	Reference
Parasitoid	Chrysomelobia labidomerae	Acari	Adults	USA, Mexico	
	Edovum puttleri	Hymenoptera	Eggs	USA, Mexico, Colombia	
	Anaphes flavipes	Hymenoptera	Eggs	USA	
	Myiopharus aberrans	Diptera	Eggs	USA	
	Myiopharus doryphorae	Diptera	Larvae	USA, Canada	
	Meigenia mutabilis	Diptera	Larvae	Russia	
	Megaselia rufipes	Diptera	Adults	Germany	
	Heterorhabditis bacteriophora	Nematoda	Adults	Cosmopolitan	
	Heterorhabditis heliothidis	Nematoda	Adults	Cosmopolitan	
Predator	Lebia grandis	Coleoptera	Eggs, Larvae, Adults	USA	
	Hippodamia convergens	Coleoptera	Eggs, Larvae	USA, Mexico	
	Euthyrhynchus floridanus	Hemiptera	Larvae	USA	
	Oplomus dichrous	Hemiptera	Eggs, Larvae	USA, Mexico	
	Perillus bioculatus	Hemiptera	Eggs, Larvae, Adults	USA, Mexico, Canada	
	Podisus maculiventris	Hemiptera	Larvae	USA	
	Pselliopus cinctus	Hemiptera	Larvae	USA	
	Sinea diadema	Hemiptera	Larvae	USA	
	Stiretrus anchorago	Hemiptera	Larvae	USA, Mexico	
Pathogen	Bacillus thuringiensis subsp. tenebrionis	Bacillales	Larvae	USA, Canada, Europe	
	Photorhabdus luminescens	Enterobacterales	Adults, Larvae	Cosmopolitan	
	Spiroplasma	Entomoplasmatales	Adults, Larvae	North America, Europe	
	Beauveria bassiana	Hypocreales	Adults, Larvae	USA	

=== Sexual dimorphism ===
Colorado potato beetles exhibit sexual dimorphism. In particular, they exhibit dimorphism in the adhesive tarsal setae. The paper "Sexual dimorphism in the attachment ability of the Colorado potato beetle Leptinotarsa decemlineata (Coleoptera: Chrysomelidae) to rough substrates" by Voigt demonstrates this dimorphism. The setae, hair-like structures, in males is to help them adhere to the females' elytra when mating. Colorado potato beetles also have adhesive setae that allows them to attach to host plants.

Three current setae are known: simple pointed with an asymmetric narrowing at the tip (males and females), spatula-like with a pin on its dorsal surface (males and females), setae with an adhesive terminal disc (males only). Male setae are better designed for smooth surfaces; male Colorado potato beetles have been observed attaching onto smooth glass and plastic surfaces and also attach to the smooth female elytra.

Microscopy of the tarsal reveals five articulated tarsomeres and paired curved claws. Males and females have an adhesive setae covering the first three tarsomeres. The fourth is hidden and the fifth bears sensory setae with no adhesive function. Both males and females have filamentous with a tapered terminal part, lanceolate with a flattened tapered terminal part, and spatula-shaped with an enlarged tape-like terminal part. Males have a discoidal terminal part with a bulge around the disc. Female elytra appears smooth on the surface, but further magnification shows irregular lines. This indicates fluid on the elytra.

== Genetics ==
=== Genetic differentiation from agriculture ===
Colorado potato beetles display genetic differentiation based on region. In the Columbia Basin and Central Sands, beetles in the Columbia Basin had less genetic diversity than those in Central Sands. According to the study done by Crossly, Rondon, and Schoville, in the paper Effects of contemporary agricultural land cover on Colorado potato beetle genetic differentiation in the Columbia Basin and Central Sands, nucleotide diversity in the Columbia Basin beetles ranged from 0.0056–0.0063 and 0.0073–0.0080 in Central Sands. Heterozygosity data showed the Columbia Basin was 19.4% ± 0.4% and 21.6% ± 0.8% in the Central Sands. Additional mitochondrial DNA sequencing showed two haplotypes in the Columbia Basin compared to places like Wisconsin showed seven haplotypes.

Reasoning behind the genetic diversity is the landscapes of the regions: shrub-land and grains in the Columbia Basin versus the forest, corn, and beans in the Central Sands. In the same study, potatoes covered 3.5% in the Columbia Basin and 1.8% in the Central Sands. Landscape resistance can be characterized by how the land responds to the spread of beetles. Its overall effect on allele frequency covariance was low, and the Central Sands had a higher rate of decay in allele frequency. Potatoes' relative effect sizes of land cover variables on genetic differentiation was the highest in the Columbia Basin. However, when comparing all the land types, no particular land cover displayed any significant difference from the others.

Genetic differentiation in the Colorado potato beetle can be impacted by agricultural practices such as crop rotation. The same study mentioned earlier examines crop rotation's effects on genetic differentiation in Colorado potato beetles that were not found in the Central Sands. On the other hand, genetic diversity decreased with increased crop rotation in the Columbia Basin. This difference could be attributed to larger rotation differences in the Columbia Basin or differences in the landscape itself that affect the spread of the beetles. Genetic diversity is not directly impacted by the land cover type. Instead, other factors such as climate could be responsible for the differences between the Colorado potato beetle in these two regions.

=== Genetic differentiation due to invasion ===
The Colorado potato beetle has invaded North America and Europe. Because of its widespread invasion, the Colorado potato beetle displays genetic diversity in its different regions. In the paper The voyage of an invasive species across continents: genetic diversity of North American and European Colorado potato beetle populations by Grapputo, Boman, Lindström, and Mappes, sequencing of amplified mtDNA from 109 beetles in 13 populations showed 20 unique haplotypes. Three haplotypes were shared in the populations and all others were restricted to a single population in North America. 51 European beetles collected from eight populations yielded in one haplotype that was also fixed in the Idaho population. Mitochondrial data, mtDNA, of North American beetles showed significant population differentiation. For example, 44% of the variation can be attributed to subdivision among populations, especially in Kentucky and Idaho.

Polymorphism was highest in Colorado potato beetles in Colorado and the lowest was in France. Polymorphism and heterozygosity was higher in North America than in Europe. Heterozygosity ranged from 0.25 in New Brunswick to 0.14 in France. Further analysis revealed population differentiations between North America and Europe. There were two separate groups of European beetles, one formed by western European beetles and the second being eastern European beetles. 13% of total variation is from variation among the two continent groups, and 17% of variation is from population variance within groups. Beetles from North American and Europe formed clusters. With the exception of New Brunswick and Kentucky beetles, most beetles from the same population cluster together. In Europe, there were more complex relations between the beetles. Estonian and Spanish beetles clustered, French and Italian beetles formed separate groups, and Russian and Finnish beetles were closely related to Estonian ones. European beetles could be categorized by East and West except for Polish beetles which had relations to multiple countries.

=== Importance of transposable elements in genome ===
To help explain why Colorado Potato beetles are such difficult agricultural pests to manage and control, a group of researchers sought to test both structural and functional genetic changes in the species of beetle as compared to other arthropod species. Using community annotation, transcriptomics, and genome sequencing, they uncovered that Colorado Potato beetles have a genome consisting of several transposable elements. Transposons are sequences of genetic material that can shift/move their place within an organism's genome, and 17% of the Colorado Potato beetles’ genome consists of transposable elements. This helps explain their rapid evolution to continually resist insecticides, contributing to their global spread.

== As an agricultural pest ==
Dutch newsreel from 1947

=== Factors affecting beetle dispersal ===
Colorado potato beetles are highly mobile and are considered pests. Colorado potato beetles disperse to hosts via walking and flight. Flights have three types: short, long, and diapause. Diapause is a long-distance flight that occurs at the end of the summer. In order for dispersal to occur, certain conditions need to be met, both abiotic and biotic.

=== Abiotic conditions ===
Abiotic factors include temperature, photoperiod, insolation, wind, and gravity. A soil temperature of 9 °C causes soiled beetles to move up. They emerge when soil surface temperature is 14–15 °C. Optimal flight takeoff temperature is 27 °C. Long photoperiods enable proper flight-muscle development. Insolation is also important for flight; at least 6 hours of insolation paired with 25–28 °C temperatures are optimal for takeoff. Wind is another condition that needs to be met. Speeds of 1–3 m/s assist with takeoff for short-distance flights. Gravity can also affect flight speed in the beetles; as the Colorado potato beetle moves out of soil, it does so on slopes of 20° or more.

=== Biotic conditions ===
Biotic conditions include availability of energy reserves, insect weight, insect density, overwintered adults, and summer adults. It is speculated that proline is the primary energy substance for Colorado potato beetles in flight. Beetles that gain more than 15% of their weight after emerging fly less and for shorter distances than beetles that remain the same weight. Wing loadings for male and female beetles were 10.83 and 15.60 N/m^{2}. Wing loading changes as beetles feed, drink, and develop eggs. Cases of large groups of beetles leaving crops have been observed when there is higher population density. However, this is likely due to destruction of the food source, not the population itself. Overwintered beetles exhibit different behavior than summer beetles. They typically fly less because it is an adaptation to the higher risks of food deprivation in the spring compared to summer. During the summer, the adults that emerge walk until they eat enough to develop proper flight muscles and develop a proper elytra.

=== Motivations for dispersal and stimuli ===
Colorado potato beetles walk in orientations to find food. In the dark, they walk at slow speeds and in circles. Beetles also move in response to olfactory cues. The beetles respond and move faster to familiar odors. Depending on satiation levels, the beetles move differently with the winds. A parallel walk with the wind is found in satiated beetles whereas starved beetles walk against it.

Visual cues are also important for the beetles. Colorado potato beetles respond to light, and intensity is proportional to rest period. Beetles exhibit phototactic orientation in which they align themselves with a cone of light and move with it. Compass orientation is when large amounts of beetles walk in a single direction and have memory of their angle to the sun.

The rate of linear displacement is important for the probability of the beetle finding a plant, mate, or habitat. This is important for the success of orientation mechanisms.

New beetles disperse for crops once they emerge. The crops affect colonization: crop rotation prolongs colonization, and neighboring crops are colonized rapidly and by walking. Overwintered beetles fly to find crops and once a host plant is found, flight frequency decreases. The strategy behind this is thought to be minimizing reproductive risk because female beetles that emerge in the spring are already mated. Dispersal continues after finding a host. Moving helps beetles find better resources, mates, and progeny distribution. When moving, flight is less frequent than walking in cultivated fields than in the wild.

Researchers have also evaluated how flight frequency is related to the beetle's diet. In a beetle population that had returned from diapause and been exposed to poor food conditions, mean flight frequency was decreased. This is because beetles required better food conditions to regenerate their flight muscles. Prior to diapause, beetles increased their flight frequency to compensate for poor food conditions.

=== Potato crop pest ===
Around 1840, L. decemlineata adopted the cultivated potato into its host range and it rapidly became a most destructive pest of potato crops. It is today considered to be the most important insect defoliator of potatoes. It may also cause considerable damage to tomato and aubergine crops with both adults and larvae feeding on the plant's foliage. Larvae may defoliate potato plants resulting in yield losses up to 100% if the damage occurs prior to tuber formation. Larvae may consume 40 cm^{2} of potato leaves during the entire larval stage, but adults are capable of consuming 10 cm^{2} of foliage per day.

The economic cost of insecticide resistance is significant, but published data on the subject are minimal. In 1994, total costs of the insecticide and crop losses in the US state of Michigan were $13.3 million, representing 13.7% of the total value of the crop. The estimate of the cost implication of insecticides and crop losses per hectare is $138–368. Long-term increased cost to the Michigan potato industry caused by insecticide resistance in Colorado potato beetle was estimated at $0.9 to $1.4 million each year.

=== Potato protection ===
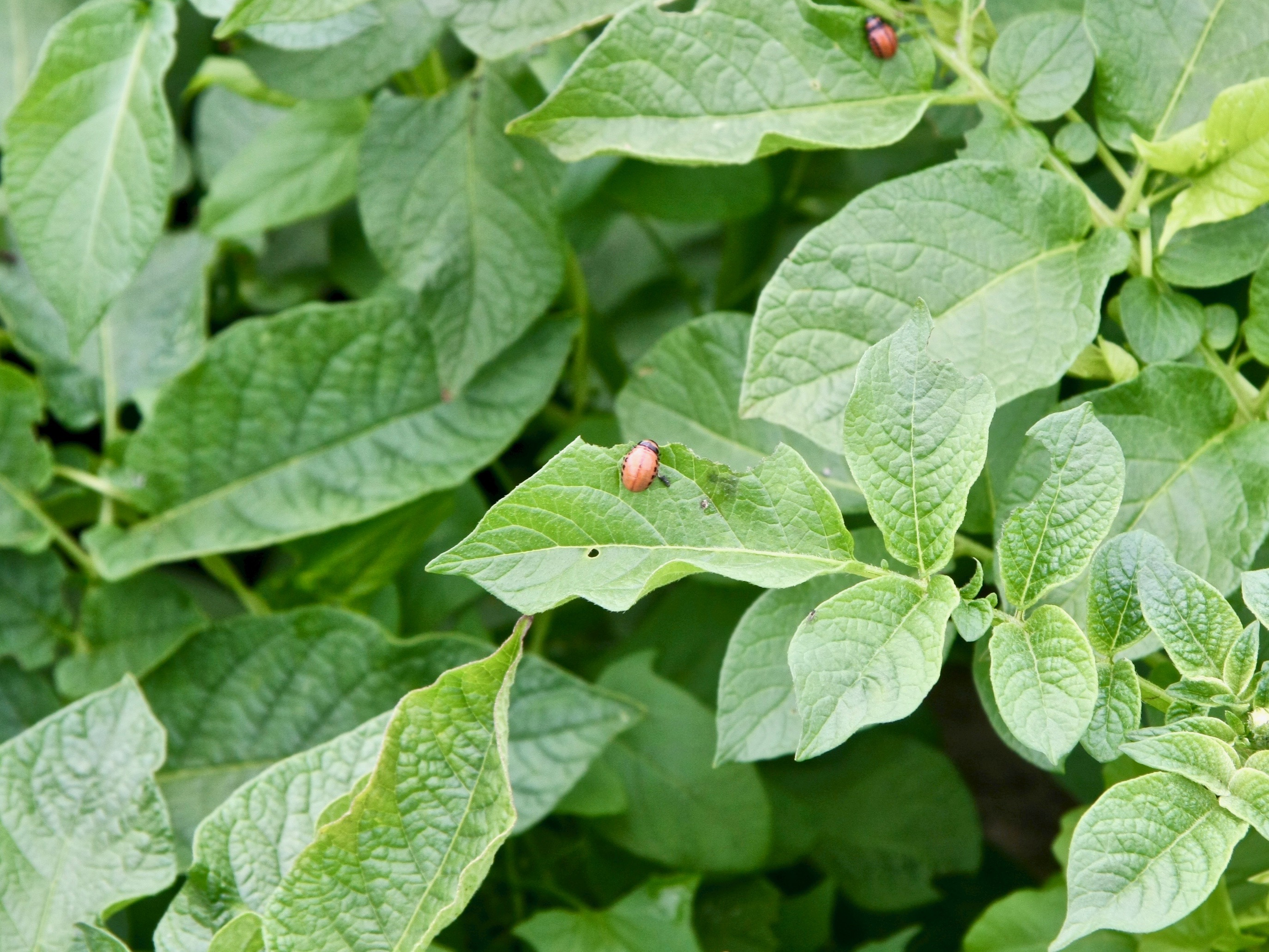
A Colorado beetle larva eating a leaf of a potato plant

Colorado potato beetles pose significant dangers to potatoes, which are a quintessential agricultural crop. In response to the damage they do, some potatoes have been genetically modified to resist attack and damage from the beetles. Specifically, the Russet Burbank Potato. The insertion of a cryIIIA gene that codes for the insect control protein Bacillus thuringiensis var. Tenebrionis is the method that was used. Previous research has shown that the wild-type nucleotide sequence of cryIIIA genes lead to low expression levels in plants. Plants with this gene expressed the cryIIIA protein at levels less than 0.001% of total leaf protein. Such plants contain some resistance and toxicity to the Colorado potato beetles, but consistent protection requires higher levels of expression of the cryIIIA gene. Scientists modified cryIIIA by modifying the DNA protein-coding sequence without altering the amino acid sequence. The gene was transferred into the potato through a vector, specifically a Agrobacterium tumefaciens mediated transfer.

Following the introduction of the gene, Russet Burbank potato plants with the gene were tested for kanamycin resistance and Colorado potato beetle resistance. In 308 plants that were tested, 18% (55) displayed complete resistance to the beetle. Later larval stages and adult beetles are more sensitive to cryIIIA protein. Controlling adults is important because they produce the next larvae generation. Colorado potato beetles overwinter as adults in the soil and feed immediately after emerging in the spring. In cryIIIA expression levels above 0.005%, adult feeding was negligible. Oviposition was also affected. In non-transgenic leafs, mean number of eggs per cage were 117 and 143 in two separate trials. On the other hand, transgenic leafs displayed a mean of 1.7 and 0 eggs per cage in two trials. The female beetles were also studied, and the beetles put in the cage with transgenic plants displayed reduced size with ova that were partially or totally reabsorbed. They absorbed body fat and reproductive tissue as a result of ceasing consumption of transgenic plants.

The potatoes showed benefits of the gene treatment; potatoes expressing the cryIIIA gene had protection from Colorado potato beetles in the laboratory and the field. Furthermore, these potato plants displayed agronomic and tuber characteristics that aligned with healthy Russet Burbank Potatoes.

=== Insecticidal management ===
The large-scale use of insecticides in agricultural crops effectively controlled the pest until it became resistant to DDT in 1952 and dieldrin in 1958. Insecticides remain the main method of pest control on commercial farms. However, many chemicals are often unsuccessful when used against this pest because of the beetle's ability to rapidly develop insecticide resistance. Different populations in different geographic regions have, between them, developed resistance to all major classes of insecticide, although not every population is resistant to every chemical. The species as a whole has evolved resistance to 56 different chemical insecticides. The mechanisms used include improved metabolism of the chemicals, reduced sensitivity of target sites, less penetration and greater excretion of the pesticides, and some changes in the behavior of the beetles.

Examples of insecticides available for the control of Colorado potato beetle on different crops in Kentucky, USA.
Insecticide class	Common examples	Potato	Eggplant	Tomato	Notes
Organophosphates	phosmet	X			on US Emergency Planning List of Extremely Hazardous Substances
	disulfoton	X		X	Usage restricted by US government; manufacturer Bayer exited US market 2009
Carbamates	carbaryl	X	X	X	Widely used in US
	carbofuran	X			One of the most toxic carbamates
Chlorinated hydrocarbons	methoxychlor	X		X	Banned in EU 2002, in USA 2003
(Cycloldienes)	endosulfan	X	X	X	Acutely toxic, bioaccumulates, endocrine disruptor. Global ban 2012 with exemptions until 2017
Insect growth regulator	azadirachtin	X	X	X	
Spinosin	spinosad		X	X	
Avermectin	abamectin	X		X	

CPBs have evolved widespread insecticide resistance. No cases without fitness cost or of negative cost are known.

=== Nonpesticidal management ===
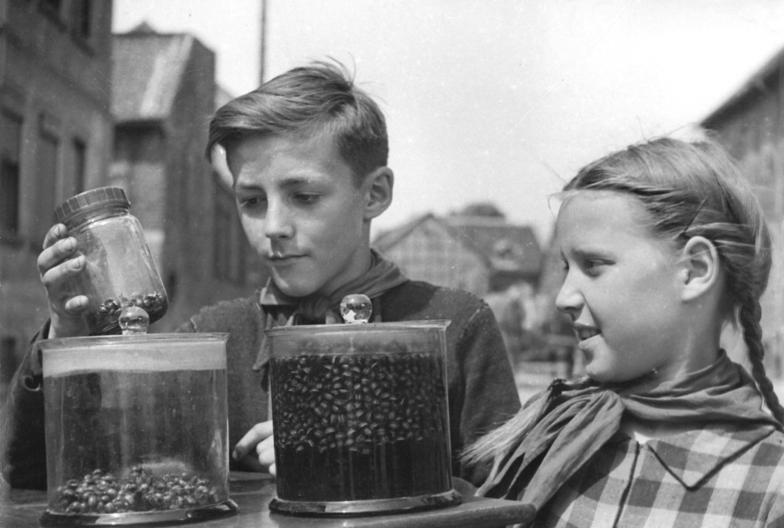
East German Young Pioneers collecting beetles during the war against the potato beetle

Bacterial insecticides can be effective if application is targeted towards the vulnerable early-instar larvae. Two strains of the bacterium Bacillus thuringiensis produce toxins that kill the larvae. Other forms of pest control, through nonpesticidal management are available. Feeding can be inhibited by applying antifeedants, such as fungicides or products derived from Neem (Azadirachta indica), but these may have negative effects on the plants, as well. The steam distillate of fresh leaves and flowers of tansy (Tanacetum vulgare) contains high levels of camphor and umbellulone, and these chemicals are strongly repellent to L. decemlineata.

Beauveria bassiana (Hyphomycetes) is a pathogenic fungus that infects a wide range of insect species, including the Colorado potato beetle. It has shown to be particularly effective as a biological pesticide for L. decemlineata when used in combination with B. thuringiensis.

Crop rotation is, however, the most important cultural control of L. decemlineata. Rotation may delay the infestation of potatoes and can reduce the build-up of early-season beetle populations because the adults emerging from diapause can only disperse to new food sources by walking. One 1984 study showed that rotating potatoes with nonhost plants reduced the density of early-season adults by 95.8%.

Other cultural controls may be used in combination with crop rotation: Mulching the potato crop with straw early in the growing season may reduce the beetle's ability to locate potato fields, and the mulch creates an environment that favors beetle's predators; Plastic-lined trenches have been used as pitfall traps to catch the beetles as they move toward a field of potatoes in the spring, exploiting their inability to fly immediately after emergence; flamethrowers may also be used to kill the beetles when they are visible at the top of the plant's foliage.

=== Biological management ===
Some potential sources of control for the Colorado golden beetle is the eulophid egg parasitoid Edovum puttleri. This parasitoid can kill more than 80% of beetle eggs. It does it by parasitization, probing, and host feeding. Edovum specializes in the Colorado potato beetle, which gives it easier access to the eggs it eats. This parasitoid tolerates warmer temperatures than the beetle. The adults hunt during the warmest part of the day and have different food sources. The young feast on beetle eggs. Furthermore, these parasitoids do not overwinter which means using them for biological control requires raising them in insectaries and periodic releases. However, there are studies that attempt to genetically improve Edovum's tolerance to colder temperatures along with cultural manipulations that enable Edovum to provide useful, economic biological control.

Another enemy/potential control method is a fungal pathogen called Beuveria bassiana. This fungus has implications in population control of the beetles. It cannot be used to quickly contain large populations of beetles. Additionally, the pre-existing use of fungicide in disease management of crops presents an obstacle for the effectiveness of the fungus. Other reasons as to why this fungal treatment has not been utilized heavily include costs of production and longevity of formulations.

=== Spatial and temporal field management ===
Colorado Potato beetles have also shown a capacity for spatial and temporal within-field management. In one study, populations of immigrating Colorado Potato beetles were systematically targeted and their established perimeter was measured over a large field. Researchers found that immigrating adult beetles had almost no spatial dependence in any covariance-based treatment, while larval immigrant populations developed the highest densities in field centers. Results imply that perimeter tactics employed by Colorado Potato beetles can give valuable insight into site-specific resistance management programs to optimize insecticide usage. However, researchers are still not confident about the long-term effects of such resistance management programs as yield reduction requires further studying.

== Relationship with humans ==
=== Cold War ===
During the Cold War, some countries in the Warsaw Pact claimed that the beetles had been introduced by the CIA in an attempt to reduce food security by destroying the agriculture of the Soviet Union. A widespread campaign was launched against the beetles; posters were put up and school children were mobilized to gather the pests and kill them in benzene or spirit.

=== Philately ===
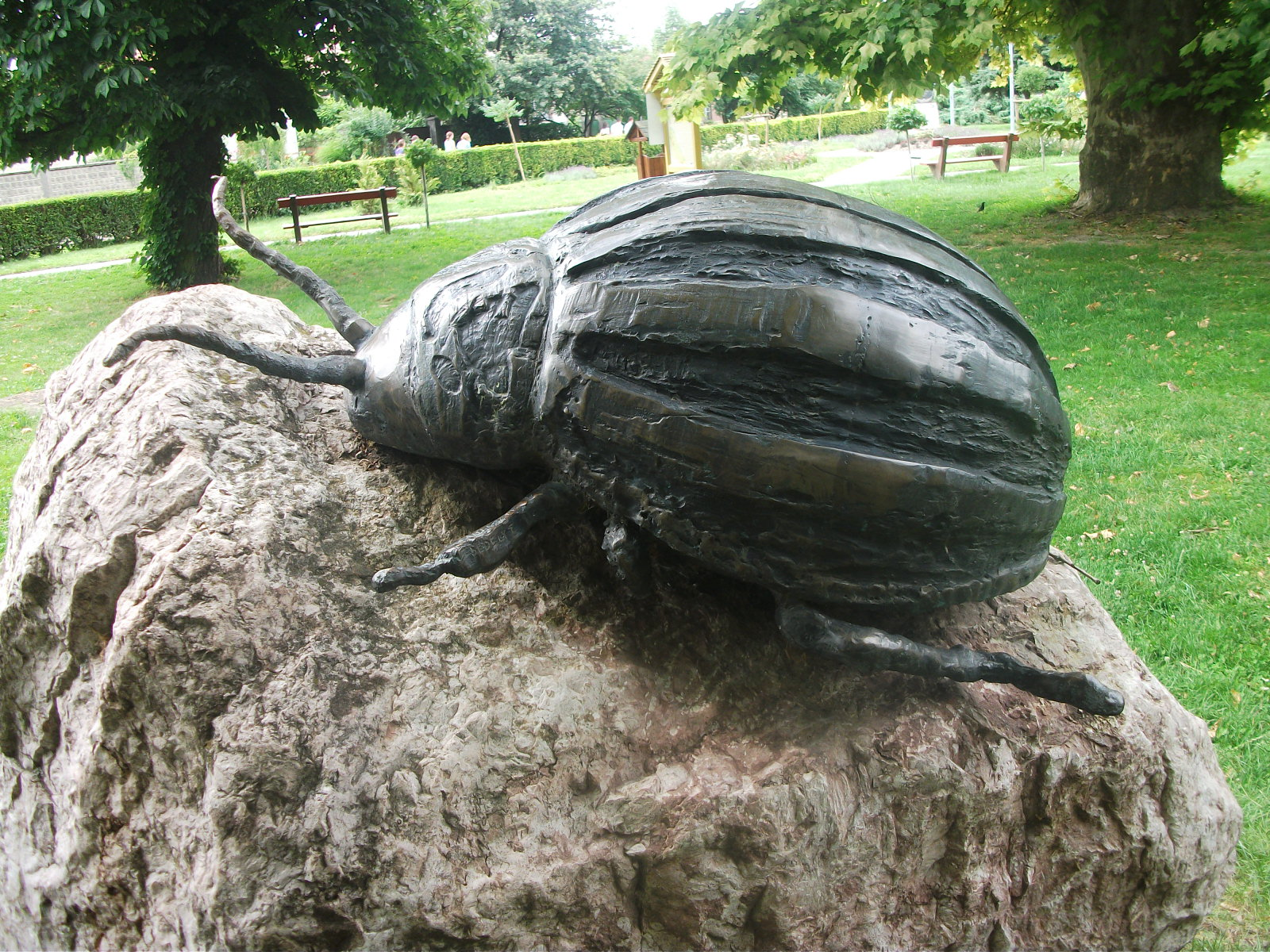
Statue of the Colorado potato beetle in Hédervár, Hungary: It marks the discovery of the beetle at the site in 1947 during the rapid spread of the pest in Europe throughout the 20th century.

L. decemlineata is an iconic species and has been used as an image on stamps because of its association with the recent history of both North America and Europe. For example, in 1956, Romania issued a set of four stamps calling attention to the campaign against insect pests, and it was featured on a 1967 stamp issued in Austria. The beetle also appeared on stamps issued in Benin, Tanzania, the United Arab Emirates, and Mozambique.

=== In popular culture ===
Neapolitan mandolins (also called Italian mandolins) are often called tater bugs, a nickname given by American luthier Orville Gibson, because the shape and stripes of the different color wood strips resemble the back of the Colorado beetle.

The fans of Alemannia Aachen carry the nickname "Kartoffelkäfer", from the German name for the Colorado beetle, because of striped yellow-black jerseys of the team.

During the 2014 pro-Russian unrest in Ukraine, the word kolorady, from the Ukrainian and Russian term for Colorado beetle (Ukrainian: жук колорадський, Russian: колорадский жук), gained popularity among Ukrainians as a derogatory term to describe pro-Russian separatists in the Donetsk and Luhansk Oblasts (provinces) of Eastern Ukraine. The nickname reflects the similarity of black and orange stripes on St. George's ribbons worn by many of the separatists.

In some European cultures, the Colorado potato beetle is known as the 'gourd beetle' due to the likeness of the beetle to various gourds of the Cucurbitaceae family.

== Notes ==
1.For a more comprehensive list of natural predators, pathogens and parasitoids, see here.
