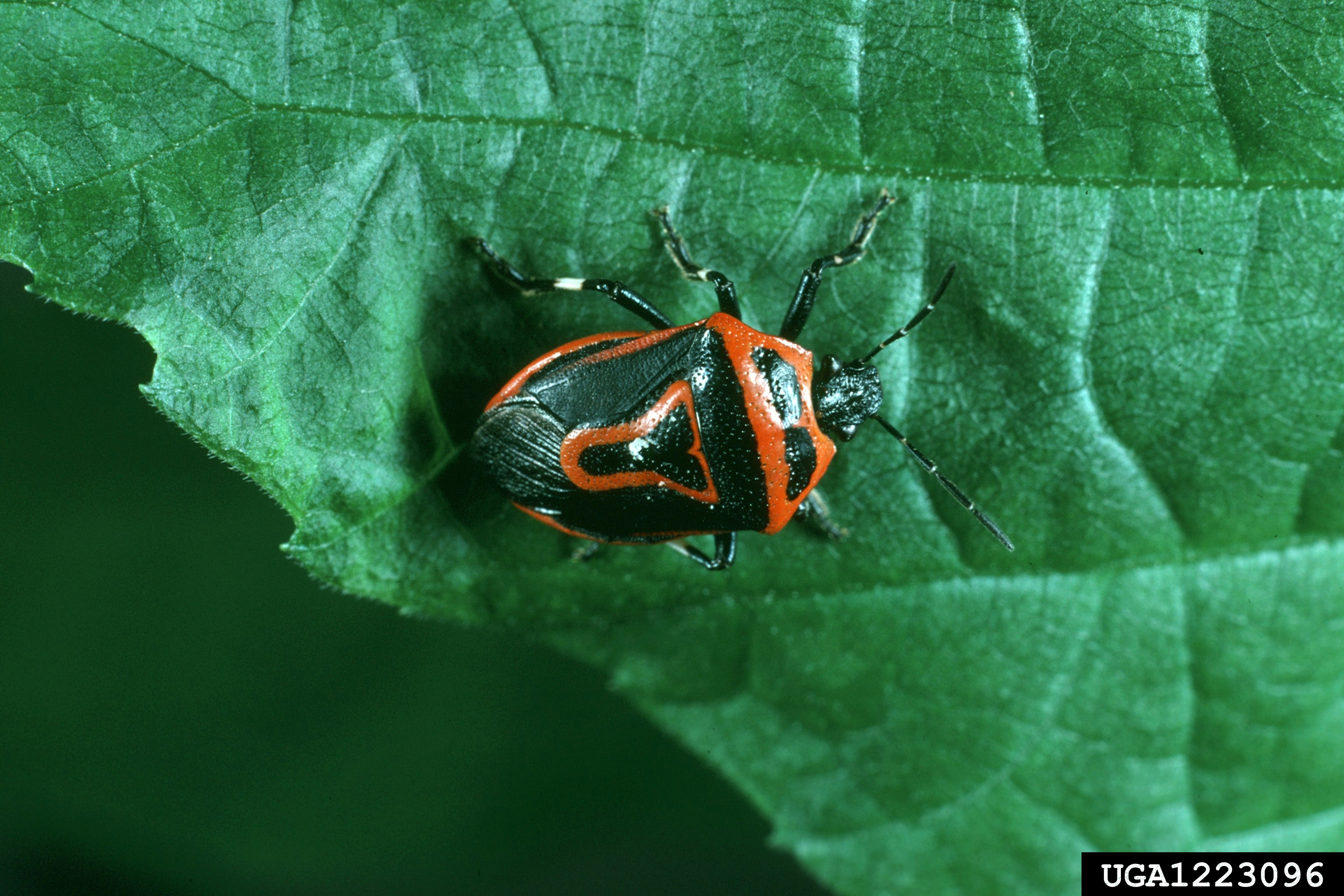

Scientific classification
- Domain: Eukaryota
- Kingdom: Animalia
- Phylum: Arthropoda
- Class: Insecta
- Order: Hemiptera
- Suborder: Heteroptera
- Family: Pentatomidae
- Genus: Perillus
- Species: P. bioculatus

Binomial name
- Perillus bioculatus (Fabricius, 1775)

= Perillus bioculatus =

Species of true bug

Perillus bioculatus, the two-spotted stink bug or double-eyed soldier bug, is a species of insect in the family Pentatomidae. They are native to North America but have been introduced to Eastern Europe and North India. Both the larval and adult stages are specialized predators of eggs and larvae of the Colorado potato beetle (Leptinotarsa decemlineata). However, the first instar larvae feed by sucking the juices out of potato stems.

== Gallery ==
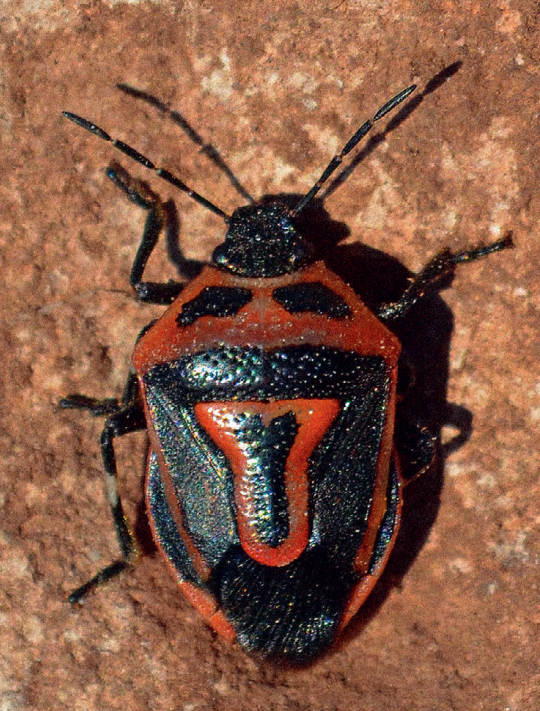
Adult male Perillus bioculatus
