= List of Saldula species =

This is a list of 112 species in Saldula, a genus of shore bugs in the family Saldidae.

== Saldula species ==
- Saldula ablusa Drake & Hottes, 1954^{i c g b}
- Saldula ambigua Lindskog, 1985^{i c g}
- Saldula amoena (Reuter, 1876)^{i c g}
- Saldula amplicollis (Reuter, 1891)^{i c g}
- Saldula andrei Drake, 1949^{i c g}
- Saldula arenicola (Scholtz, 1847)^{i c g}
- Saldula arsenjevi Vinokurov, 1981^{i c g}
- Saldula balli Drake, 1950^{i c g}
- Saldula basingeri Drake, 1949^{i c g}
- Saldula bengali Cobben, 1986^{i c g}
- Saldula boninana Drake, 1961^{i c g}
- Saldula bouchervillei (Provancher, 1872)^{i c g}
- Saldula brevicornis Rimes, 1951^{i c g}
- Saldula burmanica Lindskog, 1975^{i c g}
- Saldula c-album (Fieber, 1859)^{i c g}
- Saldula chartoscirtoides Cobben, 1986^{i c g}
- Saldula comata (Champion, 1900)^{i c g}
- Saldula comatula Parshley, 1923^{i c g}
- Saldula confluenta (Say, 1832)^{i c g}
- Saldula connemarae Walton, 1986^{i c g}
- Saldula coorongensis Rimes, 1951^{i c g}
- Saldula coxalis (Stål, 1873)^{i c g}
- Saldula cygni (Kirkaldy, 1899)^{i c g}
- Saldula dentulata (Hodgden, 1949)^{i c g}
- Saldula differata Drake and Carvalho, 1948^{i c g}
- Saldula dispersa (Uhler, 1893)^{i c g}
- Saldula durangoana J. Polhemus, 1972^{i c g}
- Saldula explanata (Uhler, 1893)^{i c g}
- Saldula exulans (White, 1878)^{i c g}
- Saldula filippii Cobben, 1987^{i c g}
- Saldula fucicola (Sahlberg, 1871)^{i c g}
- Saldula fukiena Drake and Maa, 1954^{i c g}
- Saldula galapagosana J. Polhemus, 1968^{i c g}
- Saldula gidshaensis Cobben, 1987^{i c g}
- Saldula gilloglyi J. Polhemus and D. Polhemus, 2006^{i c g}
- Saldula guamensis Drake and Hottes, 1950^{i c g}
- Saldula hasegawai Cobben, 1985^{i c g}
- Saldula inconspicua Cobben, 1987^{i c g}
- Saldula inoana Drake, 1961^{i c g}
- Saldula intermedia Cobben, 1980^{i c g}
- Saldula javanica (Jaczewski, 1935)^{i c g}
- Saldula katonai Drake and Hoberlandt, 1950^{i c g}
- Saldula kauaiensis Cobben, 1980^{i c g}
- Saldula kurentzovi Vinokurov, 1979^{i c g}
- Saldula laevis (Champion, 1900)^{i c g}
- Saldula laticollis (Reuter, 1875)^{i c g}
- Saldula lattini Chapman and J. Polhemus, 1965^{i c g}
- Saldula lindbergi Lindskog, 1975^{i c g}
- Saldula lindskogi Vinokurov, 2004^{i c g}
- Saldula lita Drake, 1961^{i c g}
- Saldula lomata J. Polhemus, 1985^{i c g b}
- Saldula longicornis Cobben, 1980^{i c g}
- Saldula luctuosa (Stål, 1859)^{i c g}
- Saldula luteola Lindskog and J. Polhemus, 1992^{i c g}
- Saldula madagascariensis Cobben, 1987^{i c g}
- Saldula mariae Vinokurov, 1978^{i c g}
- Saldula melanoscela (Fieber, 1859)^{i c g}
- Saldula misis Seidenstücker, 1964^{i c g}
- Saldula montana Cobben and J. Polhemus, 1966^{i c g}
- Saldula montensis Cobben, 1987^{i c g}
- Saldula montigena Cobben, 1987^{i c g}
- Saldula montivaga Cobben, 1987^{i c g}
- Saldula nicholsoni (Hale, 1924)^{i c g}
- Saldula nigrita Parshley, 1921^{i c g}
- Saldula nitidula (Puton, 1880)^{g}
- Saldula niveolimbata (Reuter, 1900)^{i c g}
- Saldula nobilis (Horváth, 1883)^{i c g}
- Saldula notalis Drake, 1950^{g}
- Saldula notera Drake, 1963^{i c g}
- Saldula nubigena (Kirkaldy, 1908)^{i c g}
- Saldula oahuensis (Blackburn, 1888)^{i c g}
- Saldula opacula (Zetterstedt, 1838)^{i c g b}
- Saldula opiparia Drake and Hottes, 1955^{i c g}
- Saldula orbiculata (Uhler, 1877)^{i c g b}
- Saldula orthochila (Fieber, 1859)^{i c g}
- Saldula palauana Drake, 1961^{i c g}
- Saldula pallipes (Fabricius, 1794)^{i c g b}
- Saldula palustris (Douglas, 1874)^{i c g}
- Saldula parens Cobben, 1986^{i c g}
- Saldula penningtoni Drake and Carvalho, 1948^{i c g}
- Saldula pericarti Vinokurov, 2012^{i c g}
- Saldula pexa Drake, 1950^{i c g}
- Saldula pilosella (Thomson, 1871)^{i c g}
- Saldula procellaris (Kirkaldy, 1908)^{i c g}
- Saldula pruinosa Cobben, 1987^{i c g}
- Saldula psammobia Rimes, 1951^{i c g}
- Saldula quadrilineata (Jakovlev, 1865)^{i c g}
- Saldula recticollis (Horváth, 1899)^{i c g}
- Saldula reuteriella (Kirkaldy, 1899)^{i c g}
- Saldula robertusingeri Cobben, 1982^{i c g}
- Saldula saltatoria (Linnaeus, 1758)^{i c g b} (common shorebug)
- Saldula sardoa Filippi, 1957^{i c g}
- Saldula scitula Drake and Hottes, 1950^{i c g}
- Saldula setulosa (Puton, 1880)^{i c g}
- Saldula severini Harris, 1943^{i c g}
- Saldula sibiricola Cobben, 1985^{i c g}
- Saldula solomonensis Cobben, 1986^{i c g}
- Saldula sonneveldti Blöte, 1947^{i c g}
- Saldula subcarinata (China, 1924)^{i c g}
- Saldula subsolans Drake and Hottes, 1950^{i c g}
- Saldula sulcicollis (Champion, 1900)^{i c g}
- Saldula tahitiensis Cobben, 1961^{i c g}
- Saldula taiwanensis Cobben, 1985^{i c g}
- Saldula tuberculata Cobben, 1987^{i c g}
- Saldula uichancoi Drake and Viado, 1951^{i c g}
- Saldula usingeri J. Polhemus, 1967^{i c g}
- Saldula villosa (Hodgden, 1949)^{i c g}
- Saldula waltoni Cobben and J. Polhemus, 1966^{i c g}
- Saldula xanthoa Cobben, 1987^{i c g}
- Saldula xanthochila (Fieber, 1859)^{i c g}
- Saldula zairensis Cobben, 1987^{i c g}
- Saldula zena J. Polhemus, 1985^{i c g}

Data sources: i = ITIS, c = Catalogue of Life, g = GBIF, b = Bugguide.net
