= Ioscytus politus =

Scientific classification
- Domain: Eukaryota
- Kingdom: Animalia
- Phylum: Arthropoda
- Class: Insecta
- Order: Hemiptera
- Suborder: Heteroptera
- Family: Saldidae
- Tribe: Saldoidini
- Genus: Ioscytus
- Species: I. politus

Binomial name
- Ioscytus politus (Uhler, 1877)

Synonyms
- Salda polita Uhler, 1877

Species of true bug

Ioscytus politus is a species of shore bug in the family Saldidae. It is found in North America.

== Subspecies ==
These two subspecies belong to the species Ioscytus politus:

- Ioscytus politus flavicosta Reuter, 1912
- Ioscytus politus politus (Uhler, 1877)
