= Macrosaldula monae =

Scientific classification
- Domain: Eukaryota
- Kingdom: Animalia
- Phylum: Arthropoda
- Class: Insecta
- Order: Hemiptera
- Suborder: Heteroptera
- Family: Saldidae
- Tribe: Saldoidini
- Genus: Macrosaldula
- Species: M. monae

Binomial name
- Macrosaldula monae (Drake, 1952)

Species of true bug

Macrosaldula monae is a species of shore bug in the family Saldidae. It is found in North America.
