= Micracanthia bergrothi =

Scientific classification
- Domain: Eukaryota
- Kingdom: Animalia
- Phylum: Arthropoda
- Class: Insecta
- Order: Hemiptera
- Suborder: Heteroptera
- Family: Saldidae
- Tribe: Saldoidini
- Genus: Micracanthia
- Species: M. bergrothi

Binomial name
- Micracanthia bergrothi (Jakovlev, 1893)

Species of true bug

Micracanthia bergrothi is a species of shore bug in the family Saldidae. It is found in Europe and Northern Asia (excluding China) and North America.
