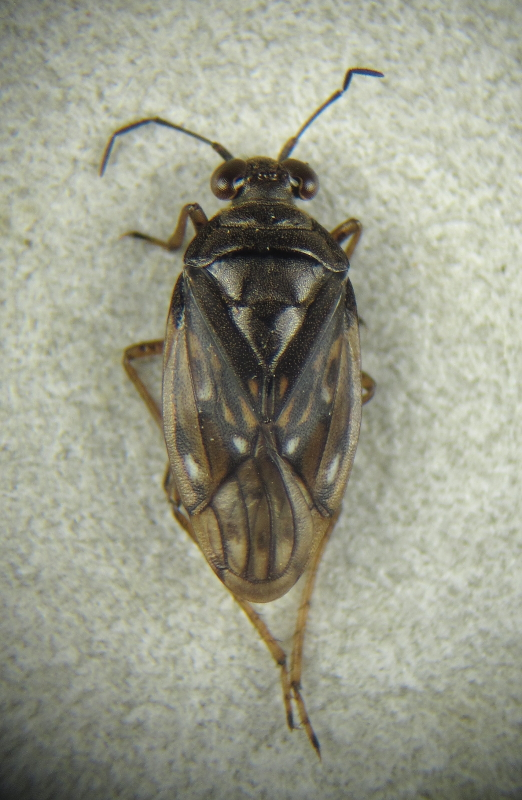

Scientific classification
- Domain: Eukaryota
- Kingdom: Animalia
- Phylum: Arthropoda
- Class: Insecta
- Order: Hemiptera
- Suborder: Heteroptera
- Family: Saldidae
- Tribe: Saldoidini
- Genus: Saldula
- Species: S. opacula

Binomial name
- Saldula opacula (Zetterstedt, 1838)

= Saldula opacula =

Species of true bug

Saldula opacula is a species of shore bug in the family Saldidae. It is found in Europe and Northern Asia (excluding China) and North America.
