= Saldula lomata =

Scientific classification
- Domain: Eukaryota
- Kingdom: Animalia
- Phylum: Arthropoda
- Class: Insecta
- Order: Hemiptera
- Suborder: Heteroptera
- Family: Saldidae
- Tribe: Saldoidini
- Genus: Saldula
- Species: S. lomata

Binomial name
- Saldula lomata J. Polhemus, 1985

Species of true bug

Saldula lomata is a species of shore bug in the family Saldidae. It is found in the Caribbean Sea, Central America, and North America.
