= Micracanthia floridana =

Scientific classification
- Domain: Eukaryota
- Kingdom: Animalia
- Phylum: Arthropoda
- Class: Insecta
- Order: Hemiptera
- Suborder: Heteroptera
- Family: Saldidae
- Tribe: Saldoidini
- Genus: Micracanthia
- Species: M. floridana

Binomial name
- Micracanthia floridana Drake & Chapman, 1953

Species of true bug

Micracanthia floridana is a species of shore bug in the family Saldidae. It is found in North America.
