= Saldula orbiculata =

Scientific classification
- Domain: Eukaryota
- Kingdom: Animalia
- Phylum: Arthropoda
- Class: Insecta
- Order: Hemiptera
- Suborder: Heteroptera
- Family: Saldidae
- Tribe: Saldoidini
- Genus: Saldula
- Species: S. orbiculata

Binomial name
- Saldula orbiculata (Uhler, 1877)

Species of true bug

Saldula orbiculata is a species of shore bug in the family Saldidae. It is found in Central America and North America.
