= Saldoida slossonae =

Scientific classification
- Domain: Eukaryota
- Kingdom: Animalia
- Phylum: Arthropoda
- Class: Insecta
- Order: Hemiptera
- Suborder: Heteroptera
- Family: Saldidae
- Tribe: Saldoidini
- Genus: Saldoida
- Species: S. slossonae

Binomial name
- Saldoida slossonae Osborn, 1901

Species of shore bug

Saldoida slossonae is a species of shore bug in the family Saldidae. It is found in North America.

== Subspecies ==
These two subspecies belong to the species Saldoida slossonae:

- Saldoida slossonae slossonae Osborn, 1901
- Saldoida slossonae wileyae Hungerford, 1922
