= C. elegantula =

C. elegantula may refer to:

- Calligrapha elegantula, a species of leaf beetles found in Costa Rica
- Chartoscirta elegantula, a Palearctic shore bug (Saldidae) widespread in marshes or at the margins of rivers and lakes
