= Saldula ablusa =

Scientific classification
- Domain: Eukaryota
- Kingdom: Animalia
- Phylum: Arthropoda
- Class: Insecta
- Order: Hemiptera
- Suborder: Heteroptera
- Family: Saldidae
- Tribe: Saldoidini
- Genus: Saldula
- Species: S. ablusa

Binomial name
- Saldula ablusa Drake & Hottes, 1954

Species of true bug

Saldula ablusa is a species of shore bug in the family Saldidae. It is found in North America.
