= Salda lugubris =

Scientific classification
- Domain: Eukaryota
- Kingdom: Animalia
- Phylum: Arthropoda
- Class: Insecta
- Order: Hemiptera
- Suborder: Heteroptera
- Family: Saldidae
- Genus: Salda
- Species: S. lugubris

Binomial name
- Salda lugubris (Say, 1832)

Synonyms
- Salda major Provancher, 1872; Saldula major (Provancher, 1872)

Species of true bug

Salda lugubris is a species of shore bug in the family Saldidae. It is found in Central America and North America.
