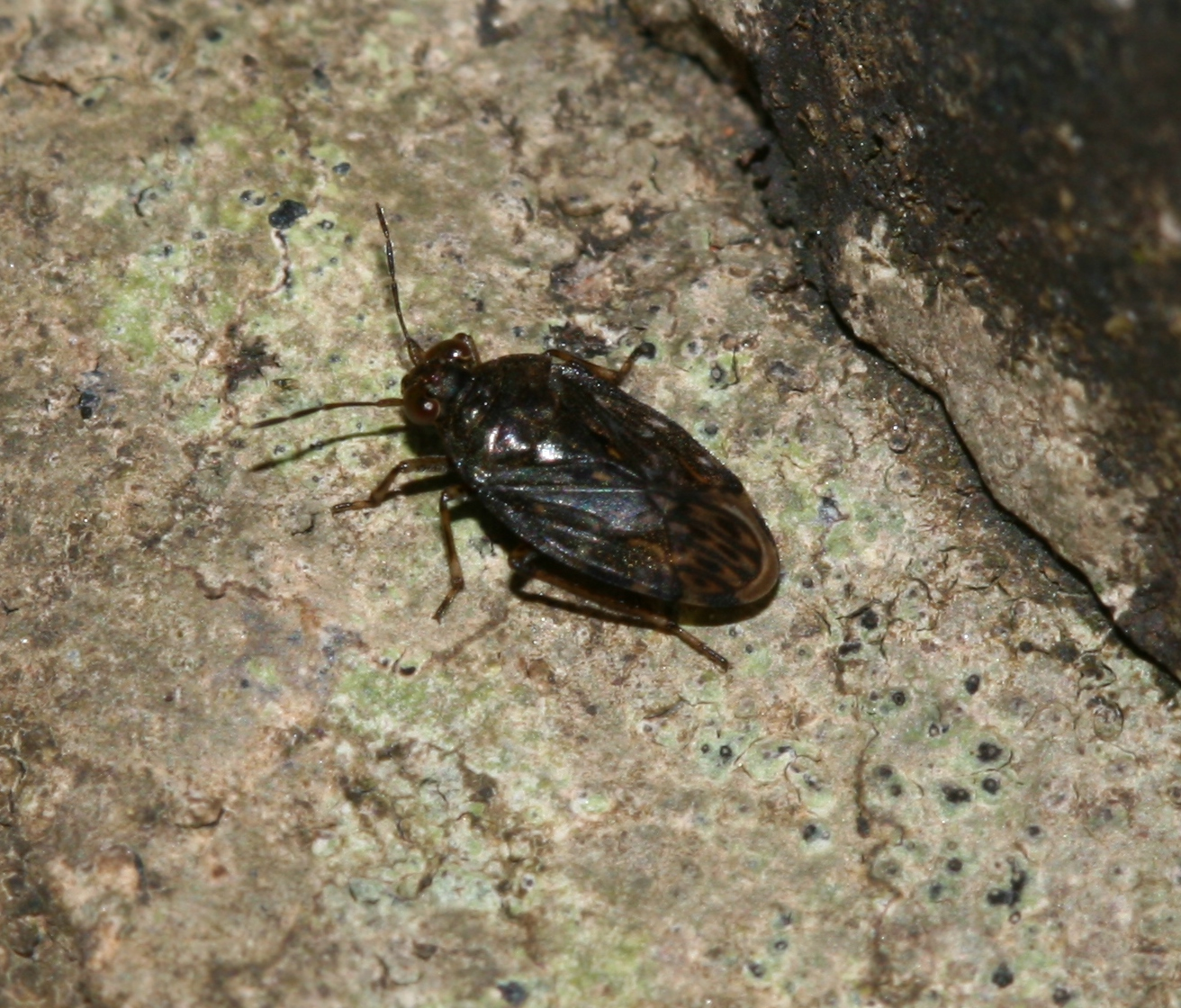

Scientific classification
- Kingdom: Animalia
- Phylum: Arthropoda
- Class: Insecta
- Order: Hemiptera
- Suborder: Heteroptera
- Family: Saldidae
- Genus: Saldula
- Species: S. saltatoria

Binomial name
- Saldula saltatoria (Linnaeus, 1758)

= Saldula saltatoria =

Species of true bug

Saldula saltatoria is a Holarctic shore bug with a circumboreal distribution. It is widespread in central Europe and is the most common of the shore bugs, and often occurs in large numbers.

It is an active predator on small invertebrates and lives on fresh water margins, from small water bodies to large lakes and rivers. Saldula saltatoria is also found at salt water edges and on high moorland, and also in less humid habitats such as fields and other ruderal habitats. In the Alps it rises about 2000 meters above sea level.
