= Teloleuca bifasciata =

Scientific classification
- Domain: Eukaryota
- Kingdom: Animalia
- Phylum: Arthropoda
- Class: Insecta
- Order: Hemiptera
- Suborder: Heteroptera
- Family: Saldidae
- Tribe: Saldini
- Genus: Teloleuca
- Species: T. bifasciata

Binomial name
- Teloleuca bifasciata (Thomson, 1871)

Species of true bug

Teloleuca bifasciata is a species of shore bug in the family Saldidae. It is found in Europe and Northern Asia (excluding China) and North America.
