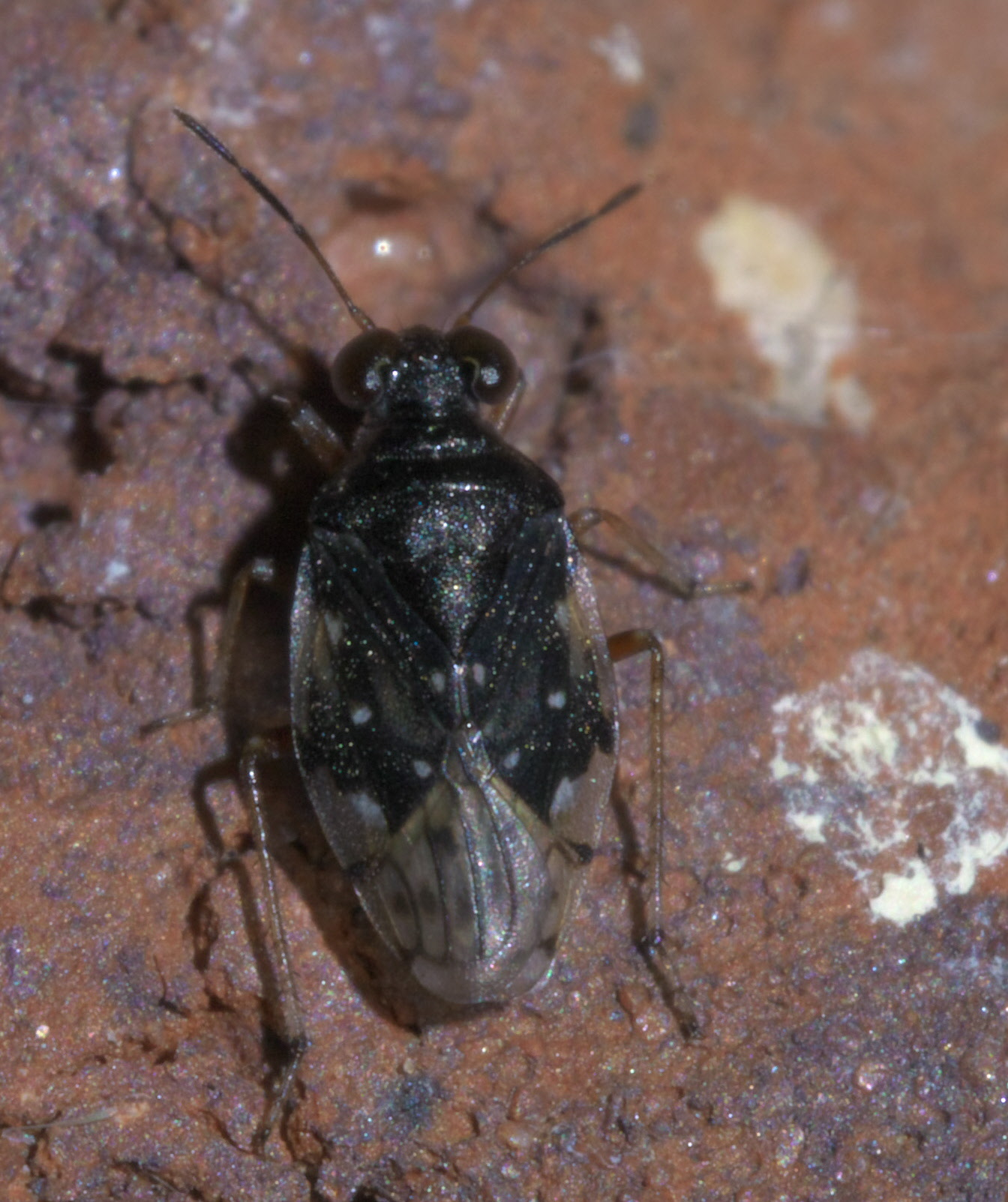

Scientific classification
- Domain: Eukaryota
- Kingdom: Animalia
- Phylum: Arthropoda
- Class: Insecta
- Order: Hemiptera
- Suborder: Heteroptera
- Family: Saldidae
- Genus: Micracanthia
- Species: M. humilis

Binomial name
- Micracanthia humilis (Say, 1832)

= Micracanthia humilis =

Species of true bug

Micracanthia humilis is a species of shore bug in the family Saldidae. It is found in the Caribbean Sea, Central America, North America, Oceania, and South America.

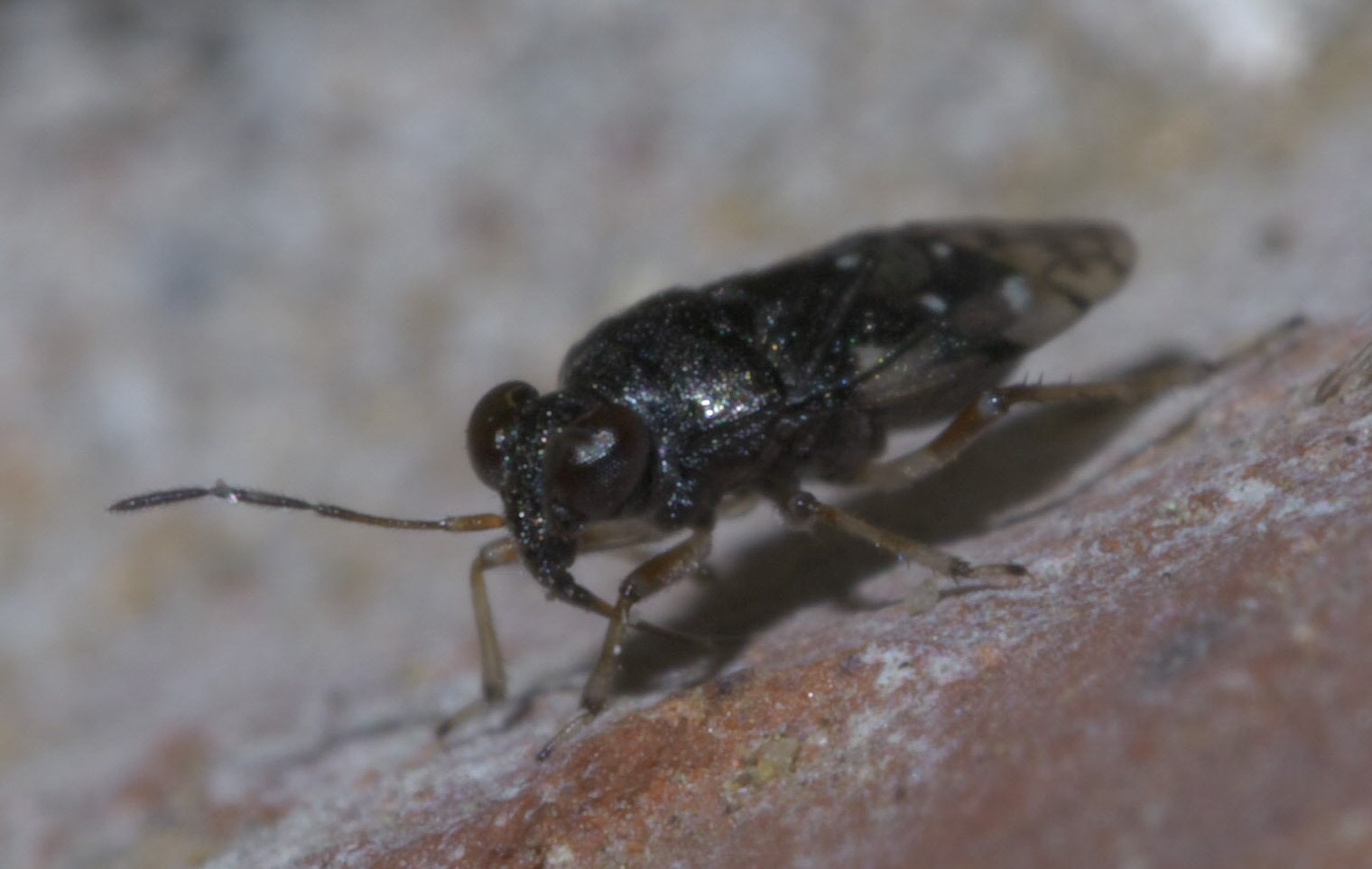
