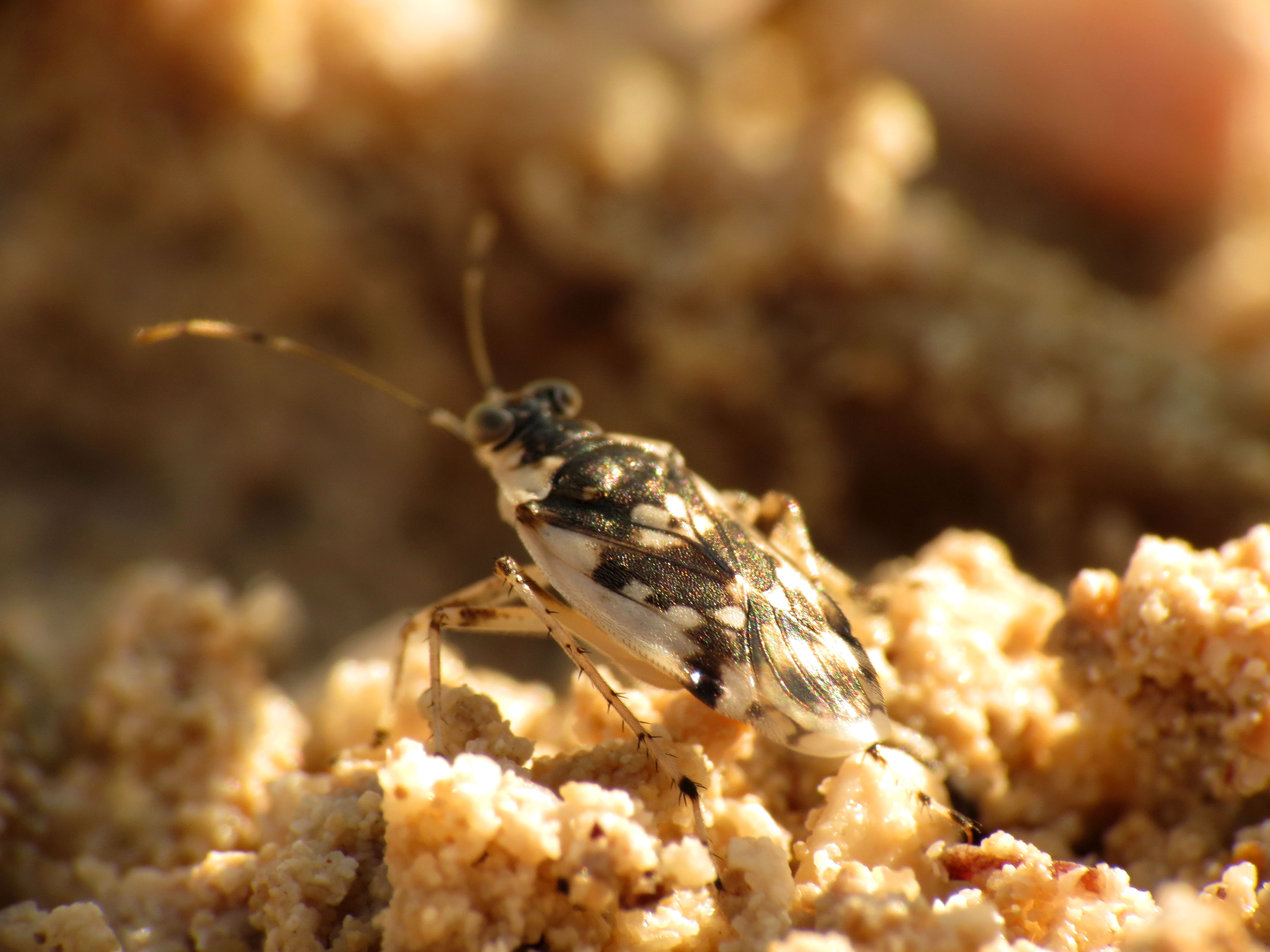
- Pentacora signoreti

Scientific classification
- Domain: Eukaryota
- Kingdom: Animalia
- Phylum: Arthropoda
- Class: Insecta
- Order: Hemiptera
- Suborder: Heteroptera
- Family: Saldidae
- Subfamily: Chiloxanthinae; Cobben, 1959

= Chiloxanthinae =

Subfamily of true bugs

Chiloxanthinae is a subfamily of shore bugs in the family Saldidae. There are about 7 genera and more than 20 described species in Chiloxanthinae.

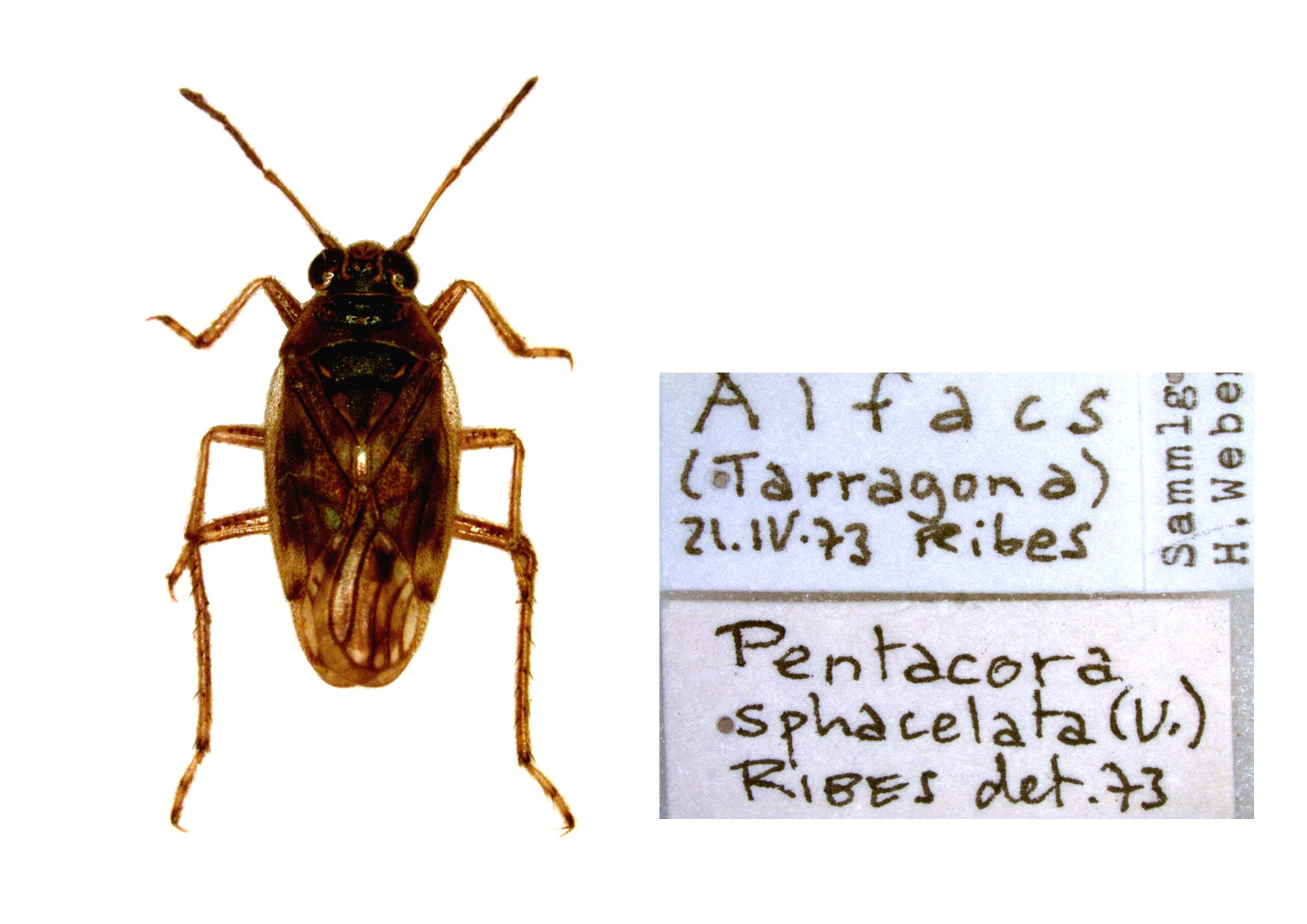
Pentacora sphacelata

== Genera ==
These seven genera belong to the subfamily Chiloxanthinae:

- Chiloxanthus Reuter, 1891
- Enalosalda J. Polhemus, 1969
- Pentacora Reuter, 1912
- Propentacora J. Polhemus, 1985
- † Brevrimatus Zhang, Yao & Ren, 2011
- † Oligosaldina Statz, 1950
- † Paralosalda J. Polhemus & Evans, 1969
