= Saldula connemarae =

Scientific classification
- Domain: Eukaryota
- Kingdom: Animalia
- Phylum: Arthropoda
- Class: Insecta
- Order: Hemiptera
- Suborder: Heteroptera
- Family: Saldidae
- Genus: Saldula
- Species: S. connemarae

Binomial name
- Saldula connemarae Walton, 1986

Species of true bug

Saldula connemarae is a species of shore bug in the family Saldidae.

It was discovered in Derrylea Lough, Ireland in 1986, and is named for the region of Connemara.
