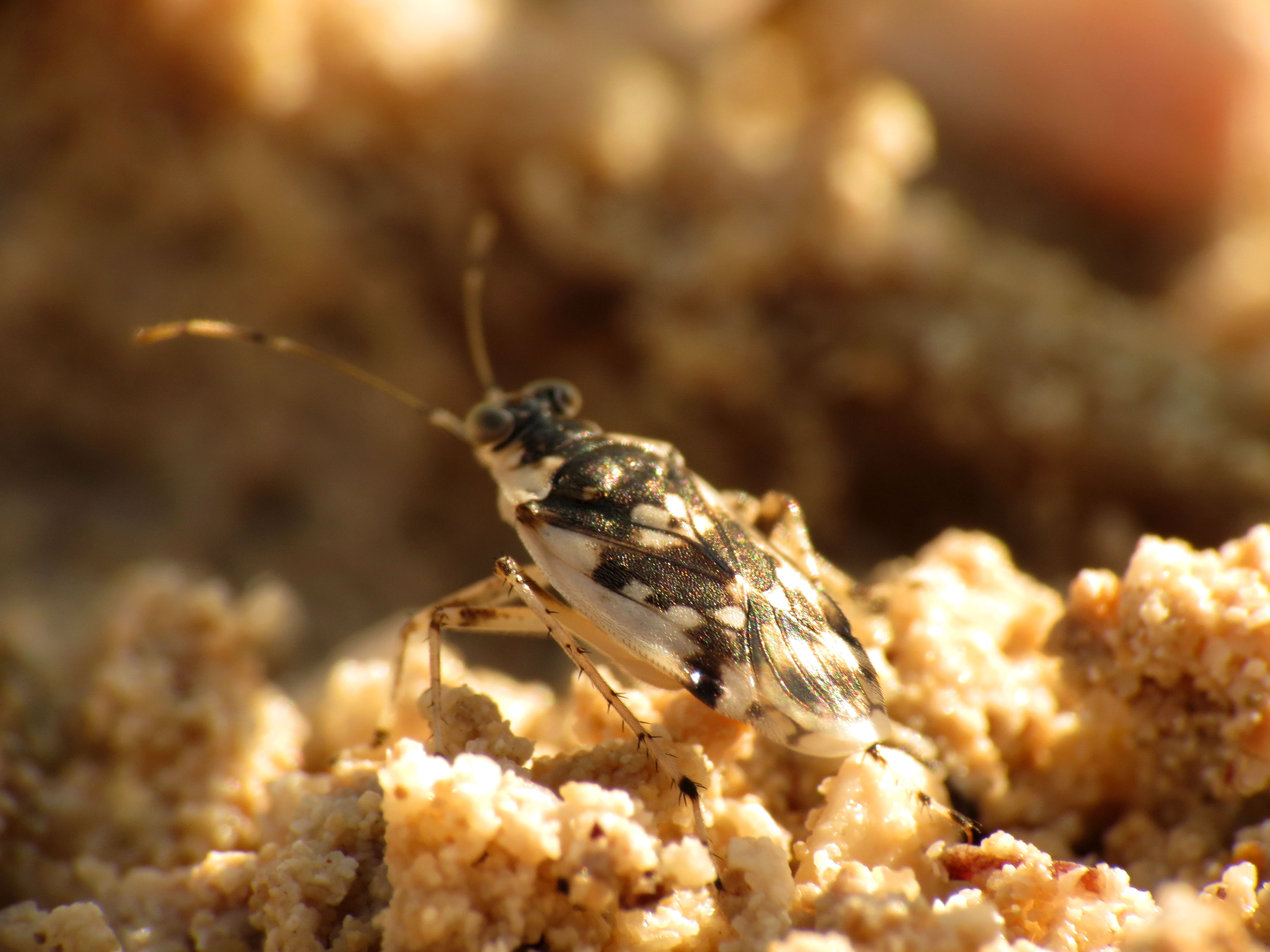

Scientific classification
- Kingdom: Animalia
- Phylum: Arthropoda
- Clade: Pancrustacea
- Class: Insecta
- Order: Hemiptera
- Suborder: Heteroptera
- Family: Saldidae
- Genus: Pentacora
- Species: P. signoreti

Binomial name
- Pentacora signoreti (Guérin-Méneville, 1857)

Synonyms
- Salda signoreti Guérin-Méneville, 1857

= Pentacora signoreti =

Species of true bug

Pentacora signoreti is a species of shore bug in the family Saldidae. It is found in the Caribbean Sea, Central America, and North America.

== Subspecies ==
These two subspecies belong to the species Pentacora signoreti:

- Pentacora signoreti signoreti (Guérin-Méneville, 1857)
- Pentacora signoreti yucatana Hodgden, 1949
