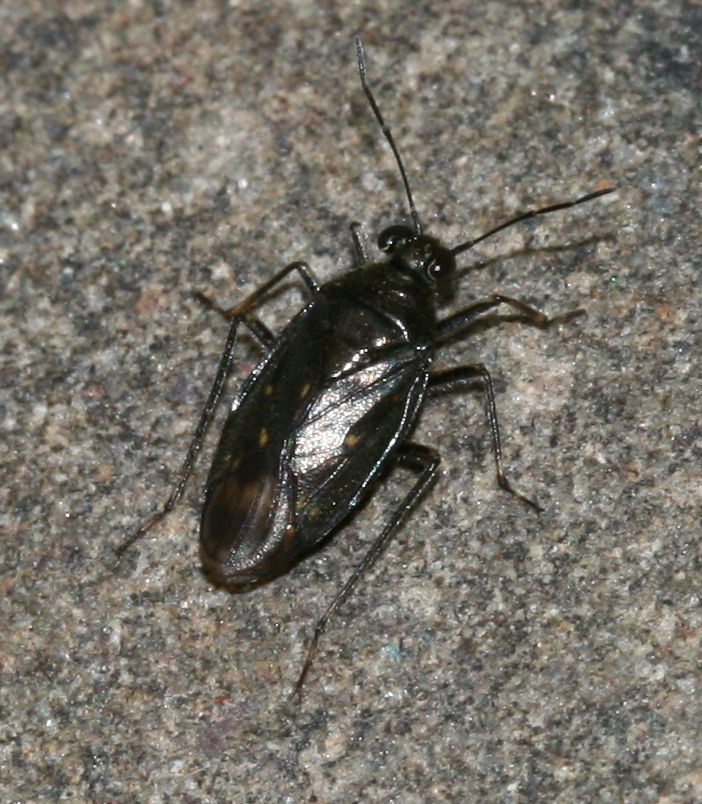

Scientific classification
- Kingdom: Animalia
- Phylum: Arthropoda
- Clade: Pancrustacea
- Class: Insecta
- Order: Hemiptera
- Suborder: Heteroptera
- Family: Saldidae
- Genus: Macrosaldula
- Species: M. scotica

Binomial name
- Macrosaldula scotica (Curtis, 1835)

Synonyms It is the type species of the genus Macrosaldula.
- Saldula riparia Zetterstedt, 1828; Saldula scotica (Curtis, 1835); Acanthia scotica (Curtis, 1835); Salda scotica Curtis, 1835

= Macrosaldula scotica =

Species of true bug

Macrosaldula scotica is a predatory species of true bug, from the family Saldidae in the order Hemiptera from the western Palearctic.

== Description ==
Macrosaldula scotica is notable large species of bug with an unusually lengthy second segment in the antennae, being at least 2.2 times the length of the first segment. The first segment in the antenna and the lower and middle part of the femora have longitudinal black and white stripes. The front pair of wings are largely dark with a few pale spots. There is a sparse covering of short hairs which is more obvious in the anterior part of the body.

== Distribution ==
The species is widespread in boreomontane Europe. It occurs in Northern Europe well north of the Arctic Circle and in the British Isles in the North. In the South, they are common especially in the Alps, the Apennines mountains, the Massif Central and the Pyrenees. It is found also in the Caucasus Mountains and the Atlas Mountains of Morocco. In Central Europe it is found in the central uplands and the Alps from 900 to 1800 meters above sea level.

== Habitat and biology ==
Macrosaldula scotica is usually recorded running over rocks and boulders along the margins of upland and mountain streams. In Russia it can be found near low-lying rivers.

Like other Saldidae Macrosaldula scotica is a very active predator of smaller insects and other arthropods, very agile on the ground and making jumping flights.

The larvae of Macrosaldula scotica hatch out in June. The adults are active and readily take flight, although they will hide among pebbles on cloudy days. The adults are active from June to October. The adults and larvae can overwinter, it is thought that this species can also overwinter as eggs.
