= Chiloxanthus stellatus =

Scientific classification
- Domain: Eukaryota
- Kingdom: Animalia
- Phylum: Arthropoda
- Class: Insecta
- Order: Hemiptera
- Suborder: Heteroptera
- Family: Saldidae
- Genus: Chiloxanthus
- Species: C. stellatus

Binomial name
- Chiloxanthus stellatus (Curtis, 1835)

Species of true bug

Chiloxanthus stellatus is a species of shore bug in the family Saldidae. It is found in Europe and Northern Asia (excluding China) and North America.

== Subspecies ==
These two subspecies belong to the species Chiloxanthus stellatus:

- Chiloxanthus stellatus stellatus (Curtis, 1835)
- Chiloxanthus stellatus suturalis (Jakovlev, 1889)
