= Salda anthracina =

Scientific classification
- Domain: Eukaryota
- Kingdom: Animalia
- Phylum: Arthropoda
- Class: Insecta
- Order: Hemiptera
- Suborder: Heteroptera
- Family: Saldidae
- Tribe: Saldini
- Genus: Salda
- Species: S. anthracina

Binomial name
- Salda anthracina Uhler, 1877

Species of true bug

Salda anthracina is a species of shore bug in the family Saldidae. It is found in North America.
