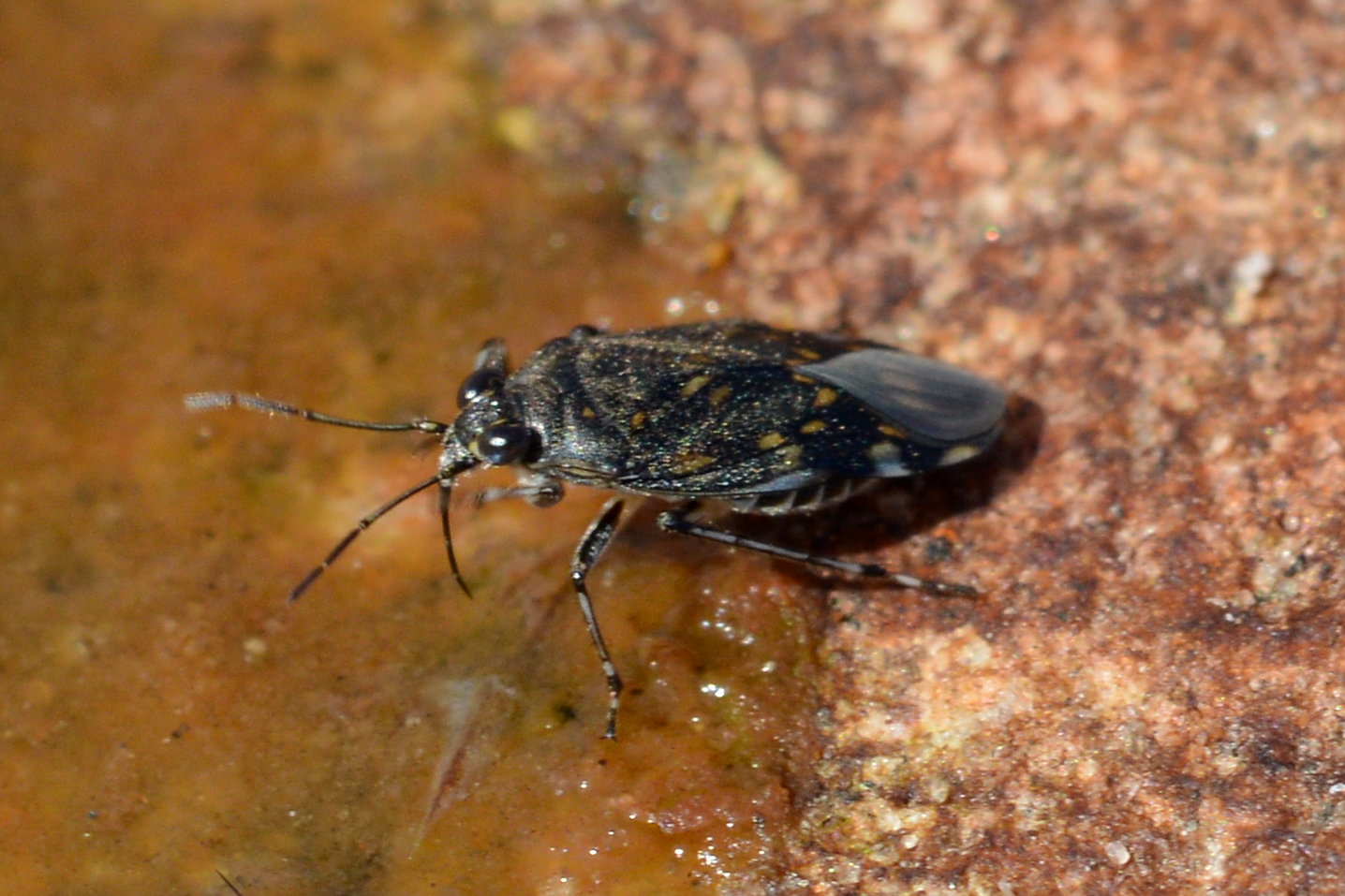
- Pentacora ligata in Killarney, Ontario

Scientific classification
- Domain: Eukaryota
- Kingdom: Animalia
- Phylum: Arthropoda
- Class: Insecta
- Order: Hemiptera
- Suborder: Heteroptera
- Family: Saldidae
- Genus: Pentacora
- Species: P. ligata

Binomial name
- Pentacora ligata (Say, 1832)

= Pentacora ligata =

Species of true bug

Pentacora ligata is a species of shore bug in the family Saldidae. It is found in Central America and North America.
