= Calacanthia trybomi =

Scientific classification
- Domain: Eukaryota
- Kingdom: Animalia
- Phylum: Arthropoda
- Class: Insecta
- Order: Hemiptera
- Suborder: Heteroptera
- Family: Saldidae
- Tribe: Saldini
- Genus: Calacanthia
- Species: C. trybomi

Binomial name
- Calacanthia trybomi (Sahlberg, 1878)

Synonyms
- Salda trybomi Sahlberg, 1878

Species of true bug

Calacanthia trybomi is a species of shore bug in the family Saldidae. It is found in Europe and Northern Asia (excluding China) and North America.
