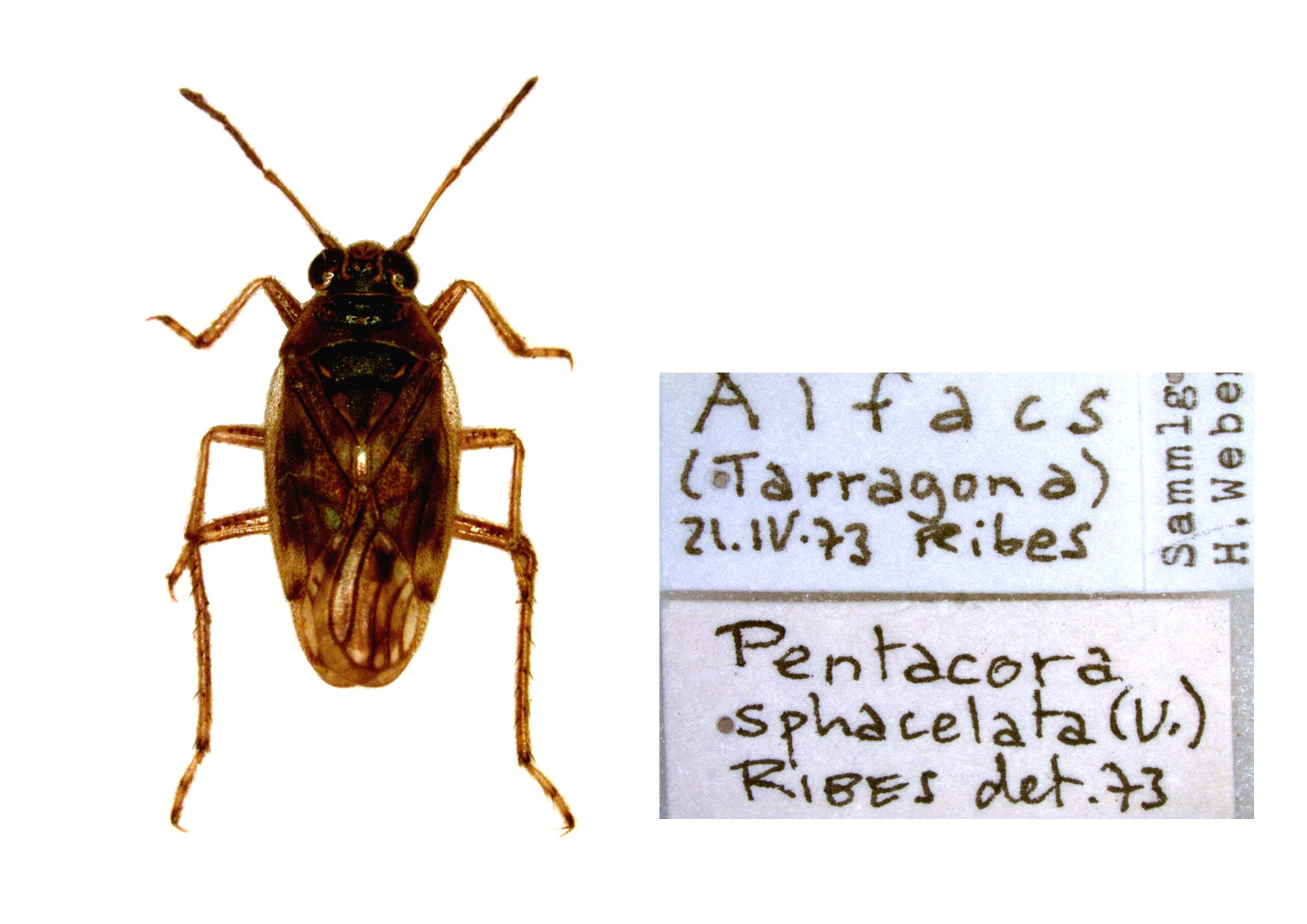

Scientific classification
- Domain: Eukaryota
- Kingdom: Animalia
- Phylum: Arthropoda
- Class: Insecta
- Order: Hemiptera
- Suborder: Heteroptera
- Family: Saldidae
- Genus: Pentacora
- Species: P. sphacelata

Binomial name
- Pentacora sphacelata (Uhler, 1877)

= Pentacora sphacelata =

Species of true bug

Pentacora sphacelata is a species of shore bug in the family Saldidae. It is found in the Caribbean Sea, Europe, Northern Asia (excluding China), Central America, North America, and South America.
