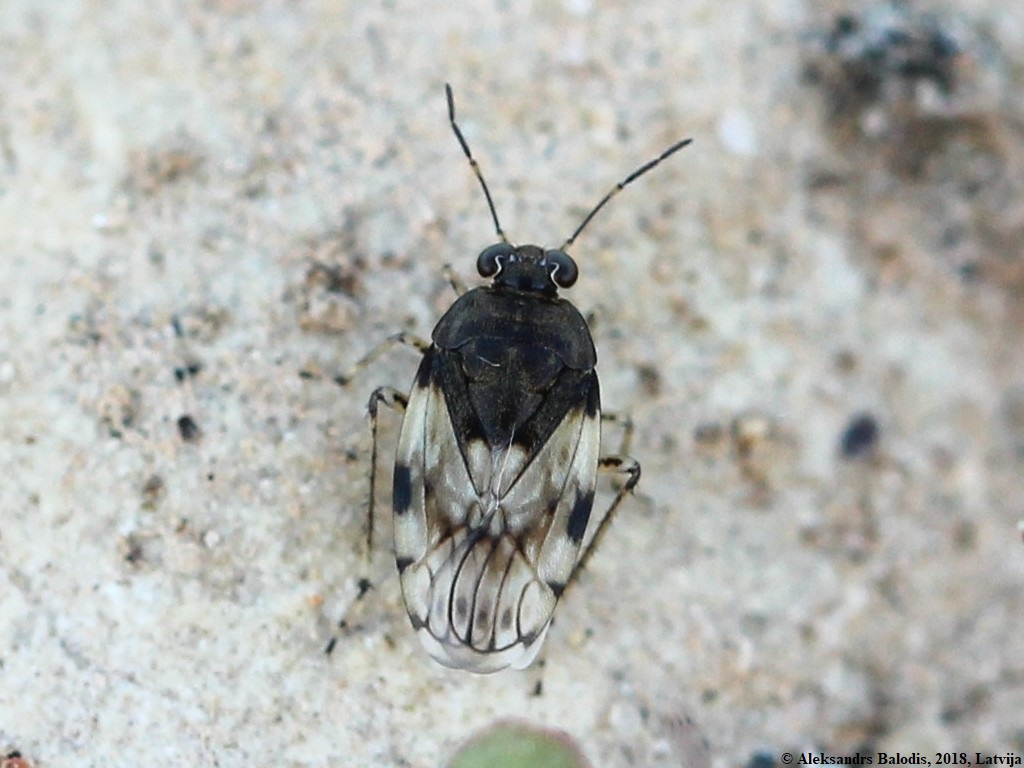
- Saldula pallipes

Scientific classification
- Domain: Eukaryota
- Kingdom: Animalia
- Phylum: Arthropoda
- Class: Insecta
- Order: Hemiptera
- Suborder: Heteroptera
- Family: Saldidae
- Genus: Saldula
- Species: S. pallipes

Binomial name
- Saldula pallipes (Fabricius, 1794)

= Saldula pallipes =

Species of true bug

Saldula pallipes is a species of shore bug in the family Saldidae. It is found in Africa, the Caribbean, Europe and Northern Asia (excluding China), Central America, North America, and South America.

== Subspecies ==
These two subspecies belong to the species Saldula pallipes:

- Saldula pallipes dimidiata (Curtis, 1835)
- Saldula pallipes pallipes (Fabricius, 1794)
