= Ioscytus =

Scientific classification
- Domain: Eukaryota
- Kingdom: Animalia
- Phylum: Arthropoda
- Class: Insecta
- Order: Hemiptera
- Suborder: Heteroptera
- Family: Saldidae
- Subfamily: Saldinae
- Tribe: Saldoidini
- Genus: Ioscytus; Reuter, 1912

Genus of true bugs

Ioscytus is a genus of shore bugs in the family Saldidae. There are about seven described species in Ioscytus.

== Species ==
These seven species belong to the genus Ioscytus:

- Ioscytus beameri (Hodgden, 1949)
- Ioscytus chapmani McKinnon & J. Polhemus, 1986
- Ioscytus cobbeni J. Polhemus, 1964
- Ioscytus franciscanus (Drake, 1949)
- Ioscytus nasti Drake & Hottes, 1955
- Ioscytus politus (Uhler, 1877)
- Ioscytus tepidarius (Hodgden, 1949)
