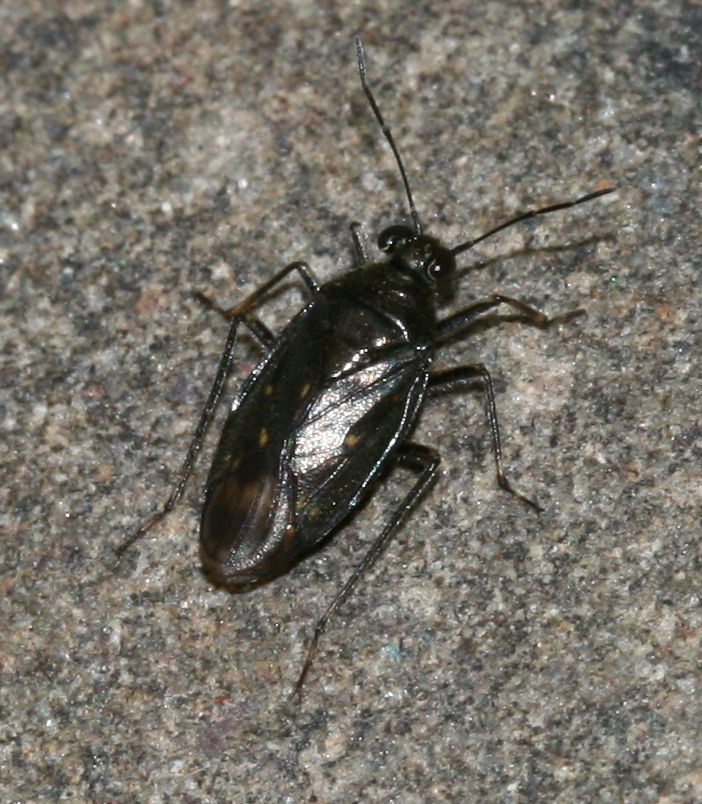
- Macrosaldula scotica

Scientific classification
- Domain: Eukaryota
- Kingdom: Animalia
- Phylum: Arthropoda
- Class: Insecta
- Order: Hemiptera
- Suborder: Heteroptera
- Family: Saldidae
- Subfamily: Saldinae
- Tribe: Saldoidini
- Genus: Macrosaldula; Southwood & Leston, 1959

= Macrosaldula =

Genus of true bugs

Macrosaldula is a genus of shore bugs in the family Saldidae. There are more than 20 described species in Macrosaldula.

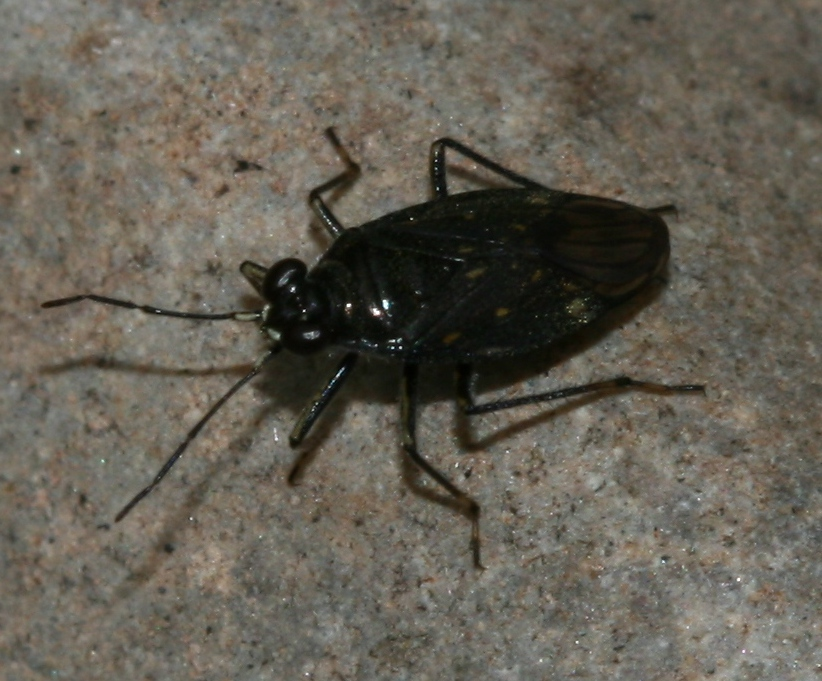
Macrosaldula scotica

== Species ==
These 24 species belong to the genus Macrosaldula:

- Macrosaldula bogdashana Luo & Vinokurov, 2011
- Macrosaldula clavalis Cobben, 1985
- Macrosaldula heijningeni (Cobben, 1959)
- Macrosaldula indica Vinokurov, 2013
- Macrosaldula inornata Cobben, 1985
- Macrosaldula jakowleffi (Reuter, 1891)
- Macrosaldula kaszabi (Hoberlandt, 1971)
- Macrosaldula kerzhneri Cobben, 1985
- Macrosaldula koktshetavica Cobben, 1985
- Macrosaldula koreana (Kiritshenko, 1912)
- Macrosaldula madonica (Seidenstucker, 1961)
- Macrosaldula miyamotoi Cobben, 1985
- Macrosaldula monae (Drake, 1952)
- Macrosaldula mongolica (Kiritshenko, 1912)
- Macrosaldula nivalis (Lindberg, 1935)
- Macrosaldula oblonga (Stål, 1858)
- Macrosaldula rivularia (Sahlberg, 1878)
- Macrosaldula roborowskii (Jakovlev, 1889)
- Macrosaldula scotica (Curtis, 1833)
- Macrosaldula shikokuana Cobben, 1985
- Macrosaldula simulans Cobben, 1985
- Macrosaldula tadzhika (Kiritshenko, 1912)
- Macrosaldula variabilis (Herrich-Schaeffer, 1835)
- Macrosaldula violacea Cobben, 1985
