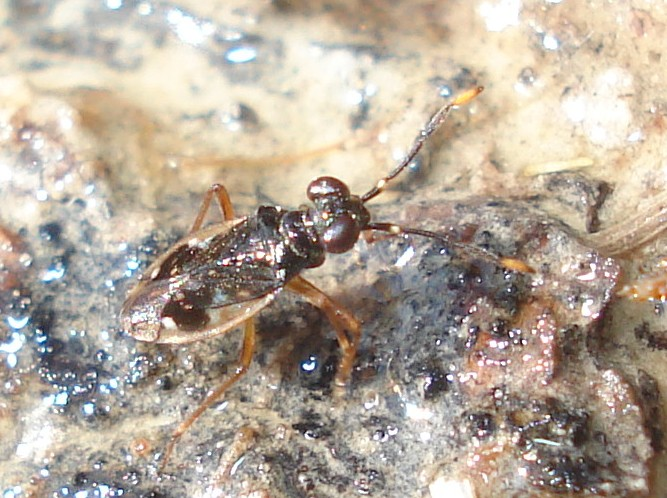

Scientific classification
- Domain: Eukaryota
- Kingdom: Animalia
- Phylum: Arthropoda
- Class: Insecta
- Order: Hemiptera
- Suborder: Heteroptera
- Family: Saldidae
- Genus: Chartoscirta
- Species: C. elegantula

Binomial name
- Chartoscirta elegantula (Fallen, 1807)

= Chartoscirta elegantula =

Species of true bug

Chartoscirta elegantula is a Palearctic shore bug widespread in marshes or at the margins of rivers and lakes. Adult length is 3.5-4.0 mm. It is an agile ambush predator of small invertebrates on the ground or in peat moss. The adult animals hibernate often far from their summer habitats in dry material on the ground in moss or dry leaf litter.

Chartoscirta elegantula occurs in Northern and Central Europe, the Northern Mediterranean, then East to Japan. Also found in the Middle East and India.
