= Aoteasalda =

Conservation status
- Not Threatened (NZ TCS)

Scientific classification
- Kingdom: Animalia
- Phylum: Arthropoda
- Clade: Pancrustacea
- Class: Insecta
- Order: Hemiptera
- Suborder: Heteroptera
- Family: Saldidae
- Subfamily: Saldinae
- Tribe: Saldoidini
- Genus: Aoteasalda; Larivière & Larochelle, 2016
- Species: A. maculipennis

Binomial name
- Aoteasalda maculipennis (Cobben, 1961)

Synonyms
- Saldula maculipennis Cobben, 1961

Genus of true bugs

Aoteasalda maculipennis is a species of Saldidae endemic to New Zealand. Presently, it is the only species in the genus Aoteasalda. Under the New Zealand Threat Classification System, this species is listed as "Not Threatened" as of 2018.
