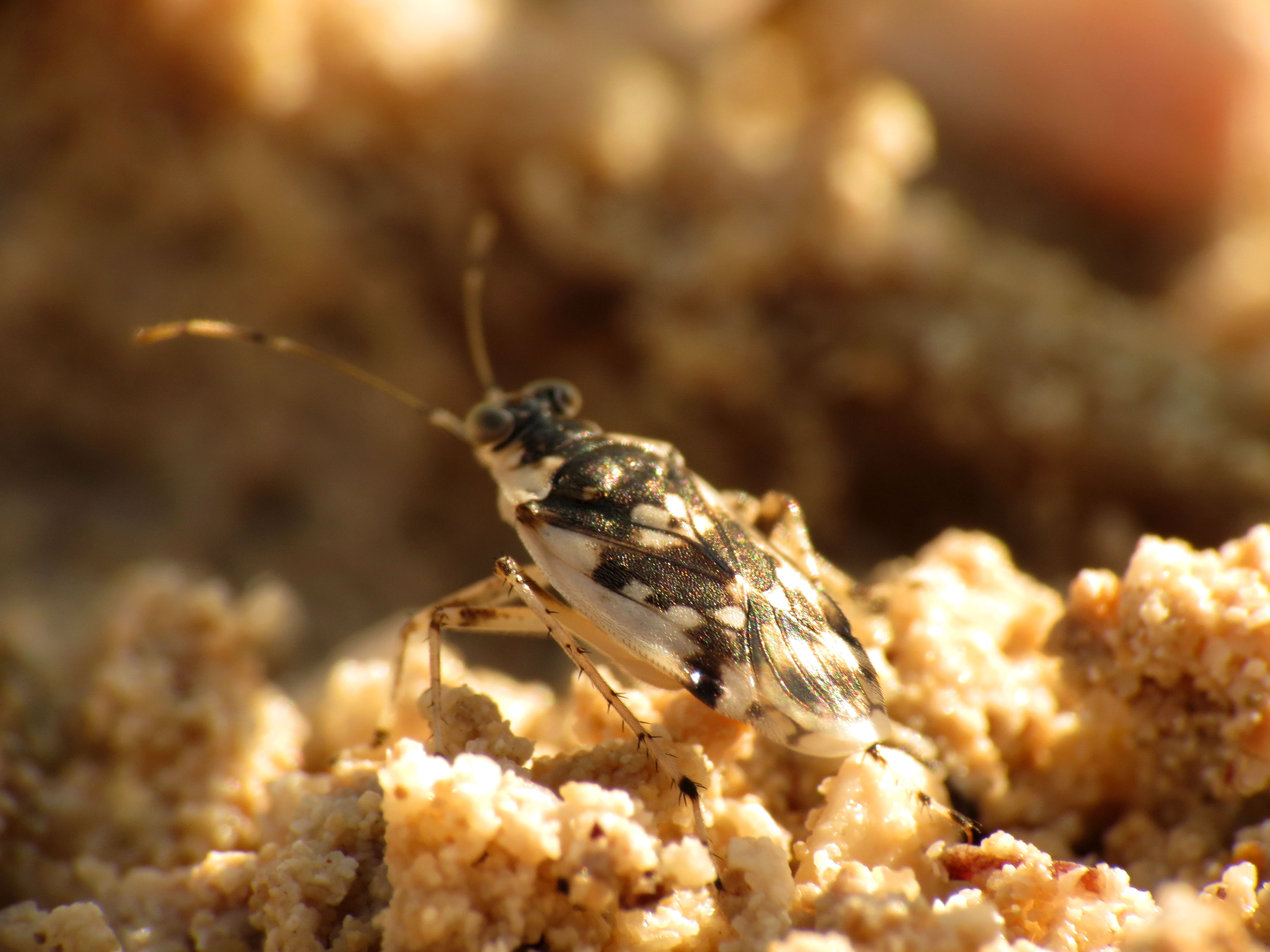
- Pentacora signoreti

Scientific classification
- Kingdom: Animalia
- Phylum: Arthropoda
- Class: Insecta
- Order: Hemiptera
- Suborder: Heteroptera
- Family: Saldidae
- Subfamily: Chiloxanthinae
- Genus: Pentacora; Reuter, 1912

= Pentacora =

Genus of true bugs

Pentacora is a genus of shore bugs in the family Saldidae. There are about 12 described species in Pentacora.

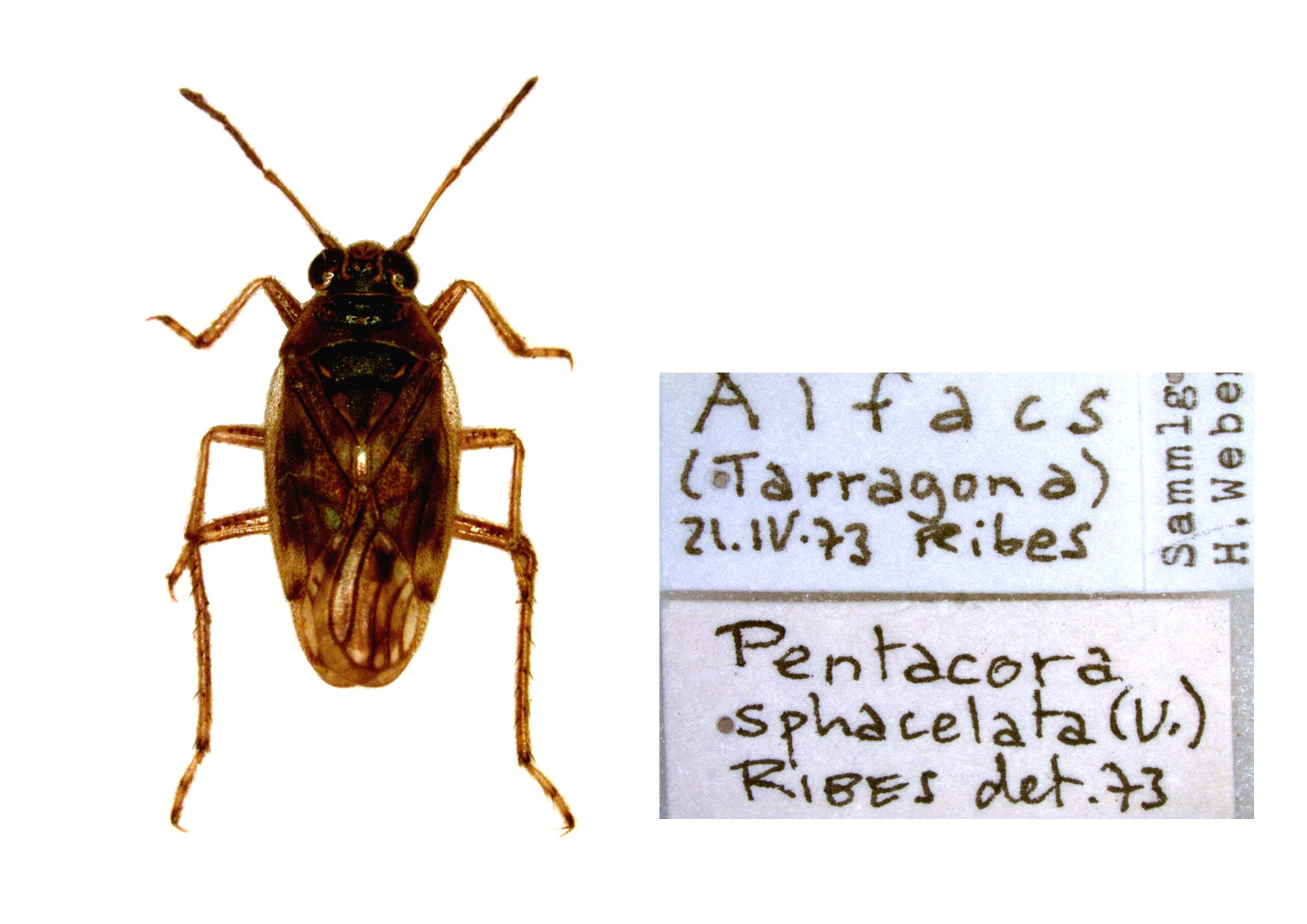
Pentacora sphacelata

== Species ==
These 12 species belong to the genus Pentacora:

- Pentacora grossi Cobben, 1980
- Pentacora hirta (Say, 1832)
- Pentacora leucographa Rimes, 1951
- Pentacora ligata (Say, 1832)
- Pentacora malayensis (Dover, 1929)
- Pentacora ouachita J. Polhemus, 1993
- Pentacora salina (Bergroth, 1893)
- Pentacora saratogae Cobben, 1965
- Pentacora signoreti (Guérin-Méneville, 1857)
- Pentacora sonneveldti Blöte, 1947
- Pentacora spacelata (Uhler, 1877)
- Pentacora sphacelata (Uhler, 1877)
