= Saldoida =

Scientific classification
- Domain: Eukaryota
- Kingdom: Animalia
- Phylum: Arthropoda
- Class: Insecta
- Order: Hemiptera
- Suborder: Heteroptera
- Family: Saldidae
- Subfamily: Saldinae
- Tribe: Saldoidini
- Genus: Saldoida; Osborn, 1901

Genus of true bugs

Saldoida is a genus of shore bugs in the family Saldidae. There are about five described species in Saldoida.

== Species ==
These five species belong to the genus Saldoida:

- Saldoida armata Horváth, 1911
- Saldoida cornuta Osborn, 1901
- Saldoida schmitzi Cobben, 1987
- Saldoida slossonae Osborn, 1901
- Saldoida turbaria Schuh, 1967
