= Zemacrosaldula =

Scientific classification
- Kingdom: Animalia
- Phylum: Arthropoda
- Class: Insecta
- Order: Hemiptera
- Suborder: Heteroptera
- Family: Saldidae
- Subfamily: Saldinae
- Tribe: Saldoidini
- Genus: Zemacrosaldula; Larivière & Larochelle, 2015

Genus of true bugs

Zemacrosaldula is a genus of Saldidae endemic to New Zealand.

== Species ==
There are four species in the genus Zemacrosaldula:

- Zemacrosaldula kapekape Larivière & Larochelle, 2015
- Zemacrosaldula pangare Larivière & Larochelle, 2015
- Zemacrosaldula whakarunga Larivière & Larochelle, 2015
- Zemacrosaldula australis (White, 1876)
