= Salda (bug) =

Scientific classification
- Domain: Eukaryota
- Kingdom: Animalia
- Phylum: Arthropoda
- Class: Insecta
- Order: Hemiptera
- Suborder: Heteroptera
- Family: Saldidae
- Tribe: Saldini
- Genus: Salda; Fabricius, 1803

Genus of true bugs

Salda is a genus of shore bugs in the family Saldidae. There are about 18 described species in Salda.

== Species ==
These 18 species belong to the genus Salda:

- Salda adriatica Horváth, 1887
- Salda alta J. Polhemus, 1967
- Salda anthracina Uhler, 1877
- Salda buenoi (McDunnough, 1925)
- Salda coloradensis Polhemus, 1967
- Salda coriacea Uhler, 1872
- Salda exigua Berendt, 1856
- Salda henschii (Reuter, 1891)
- Salda kiritshenkoi Cobben, 1985
- Salda littoralis (Linnaeus, 1758)
- Salda lugubris (Say, 1832)
- Salda micans Jakovlev, 1889
- Salda morio Zetterstedt, 1838
- Salda muelleri (Gmelin, 1790)
- Salda obscura Provancher, 1872
- Salda provancheri Kelton & Lattin, 1968
- Salda sahlbergi Reuter, 1875
- Salda splendens (Jakovlev, 1905)
