= Teloleuca =

Scientific classification
- Domain: Eukaryota
- Kingdom: Animalia
- Phylum: Arthropoda
- Class: Insecta
- Order: Hemiptera
- Suborder: Heteroptera
- Family: Saldidae
- Subfamily: Saldinae
- Tribe: Saldini
- Genus: Teloleuca; Reuter, 1912

Genus of true bugs

Teloleuca is a genus of shore bugs in the family Saldidae. There are about five described species in Teloleuca.

== Species ==
These five species belong to the genus Teloleuca:

- Teloleuca altaica Vinokurov, 2009
- Teloleuca bifasciata (Thomson, 1871)
- Teloleuca branczikii (Reuter, 1891)
- Teloleuca kusnezowi Lindberg, 1934
- Teloleuca pellucens (Fabricius, 1779)
