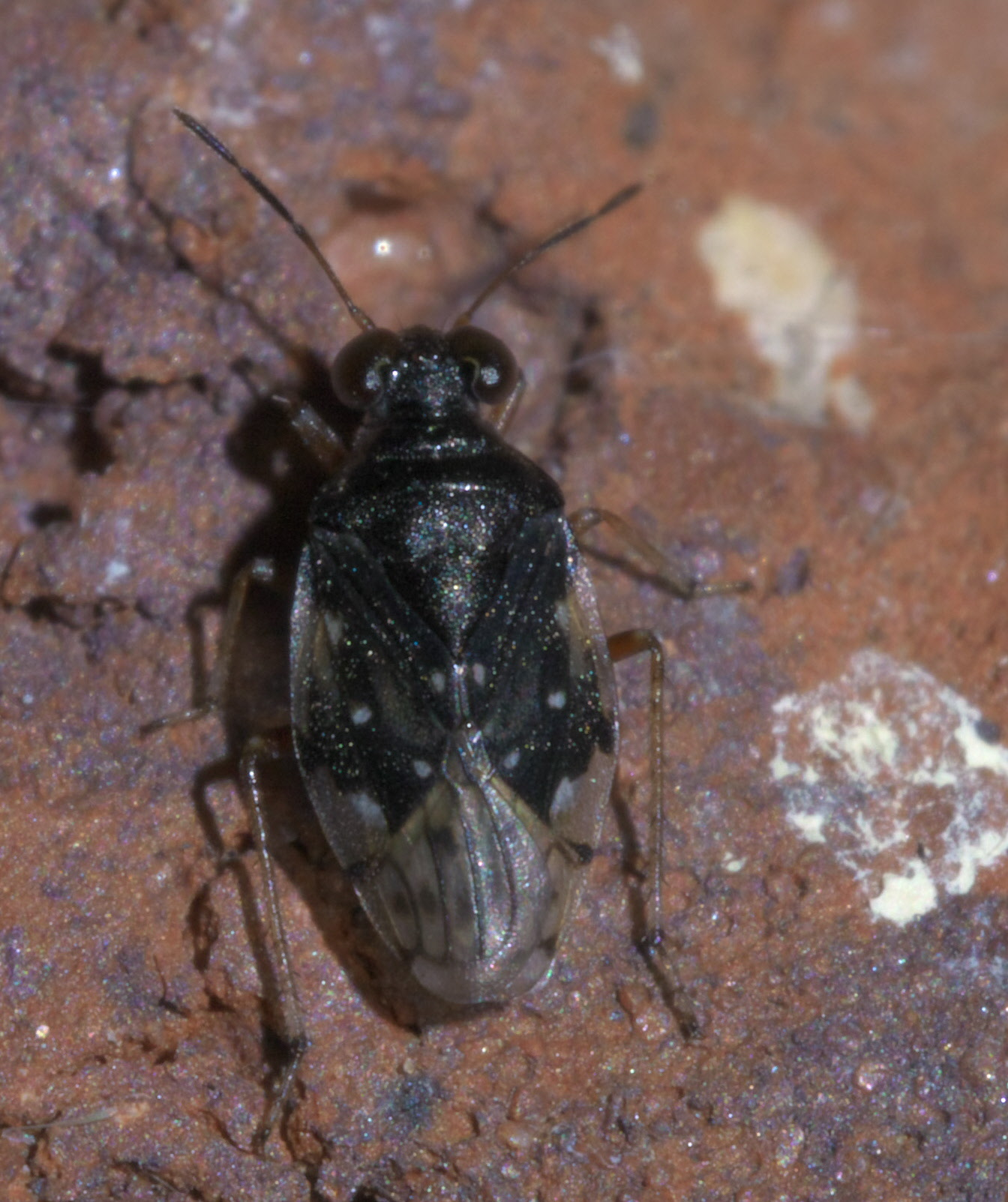
- Micracanthia humilis

Scientific classification
- Domain: Eukaryota
- Kingdom: Animalia
- Phylum: Arthropoda
- Class: Insecta
- Order: Hemiptera
- Suborder: Heteroptera
- Family: Saldidae
- Subfamily: Saldinae
- Tribe: Saldoidini
- Genus: Micracanthia; Reuter, 1912

= Micracanthia =

Genus of true bugs

Micracanthia is a genus of shore bugs in the family Saldidae. There are about 15 described species in Micracanthia.

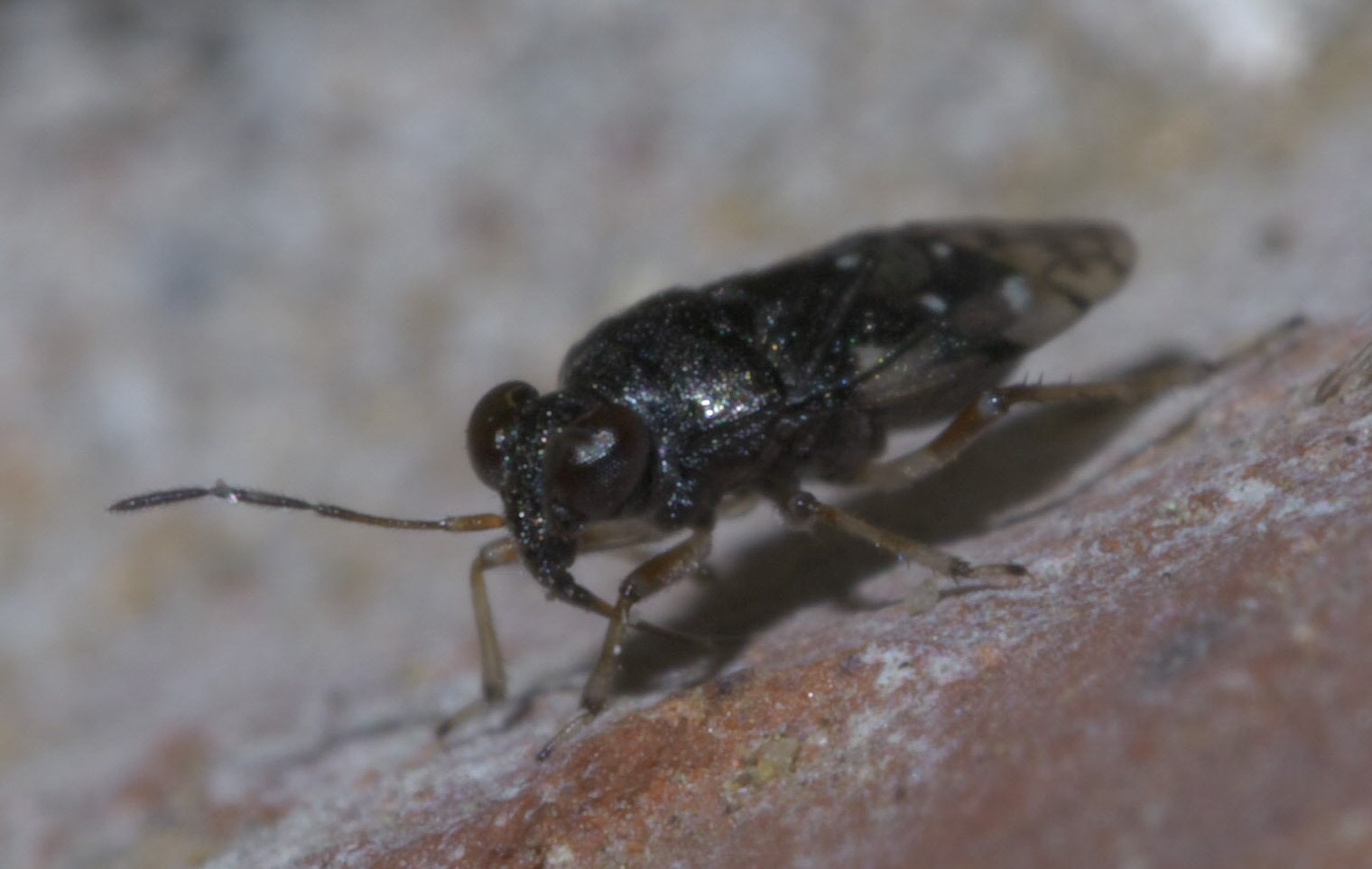
Micracanthia humilis

== Species ==
These 15 species belong to the genus Micracanthia:

- Micracanthia bergrothi (Jakovlev, 1893)
- Micracanthia drakei Cobben, 1960
- Micracanthia fennica (Reuter, 1884)
- Micracanthia floridana Drake & Chapman, 1953
- Micracanthia hodgdeni Drake, 1955
- Micracanthia humilis (Say, 1832)
- Micracanthia hungerfordi (Hodgden, 1949)
- Micracanthia husseyi Drake & Chapman, 1952
- Micracanthia marginalis (Fallén, 1807)
- Micracanthia ornatula (Reuter, 1881)
- Micracanthia peruviana Cobben, 1986
- Micracanthia pumpila Blatchley, 1928
- Micracanthia quadrimaculata (Champion, 1900)
- Micracanthia schuhi Lattin, 1968
- Micracanthia utahensis Drake & Hottes, 1955
