= Chiloxanthus =

Scientific classification
- Domain: Eukaryota
- Kingdom: Animalia
- Phylum: Arthropoda
- Class: Insecta
- Order: Hemiptera
- Suborder: Heteroptera
- Family: Saldidae
- Subfamily: Chiloxanthinae
- Genus: Chiloxanthus; Reuter, 1891

Genus of true bugs

Chiloxanthus is a genus of shore bugs in the family Saldidae. There are about nine described species in Chiloxanthus.

== Species ==
These nine species belong to the genus Chiloxanthus:

- Chiloxanthus alticola Kiritshenko, 1931
- Chiloxanthus arcticus (Sahlberg, 1878)
- Chiloxanthus corporaali Lindberg, 1935
- Chiloxanthus kozlovi (Kiritshenko, 1912)
- Chiloxanthus lama (Kiritshenko, 1912)
- Chiloxanthus pilosus (Fallén, 1807)
- Chiloxanthus poloi (Kiritshenko, 1912)
- Chiloxanthus sangchana Drake, 1954
- Chiloxanthus stellatus (Curtis, 1835)
