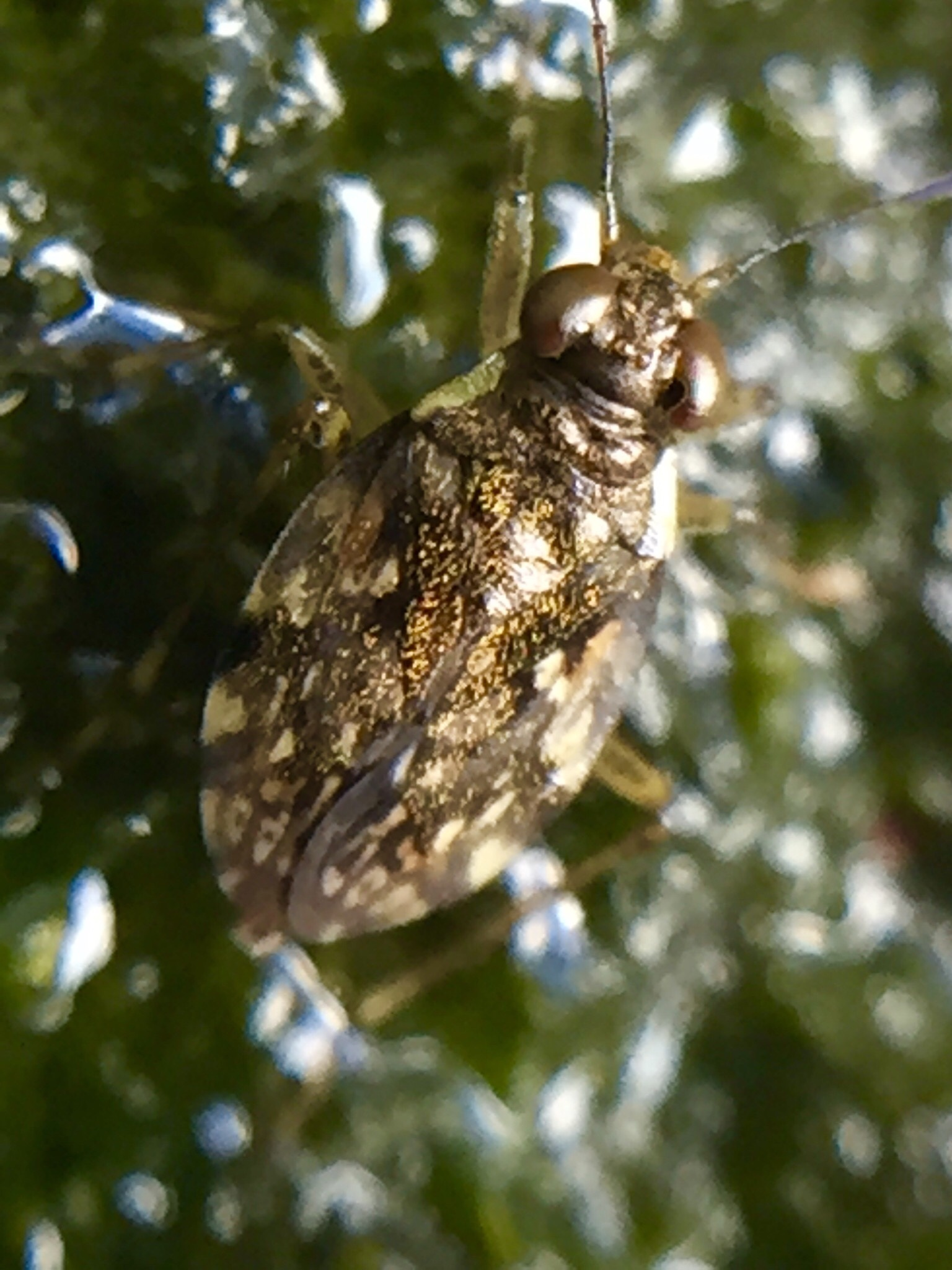
- Kiwisaldula parvula

Scientific classification
- Kingdom: Animalia
- Phylum: Arthropoda
- Class: Insecta
- Order: Hemiptera
- Suborder: Heteroptera
- Family: Saldidae
- Subfamily: Saldinae
- Tribe: Saldoidini
- Genus: Kiwisaldula; Larivière & Larochelle, 2016

= Kiwisaldula =

Genus of true bugs

Kiwisaldula is a genus of Saldidae endemic to New Zealand.

== Species ==
There are 12 species in the genus Kiwisaldula:

- Kiwisaldula butleri (White, 1878)
- Kiwisaldula cranshawi Larivière & Larochelle, 2018
- Kiwisaldula hurunui Larivière & Larochelle, 2017
- Kiwisaldula januszkiewiczi Larivière & Larochelle, 2018
- Kiwisaldula laelaps (White, 1878)
- Kiwisaldula manawatawhi Larivière & Larochelle, 2016
- Kiwisaldula parvula (Cobben, 1961)
- Kiwisaldula porangahau Larivière & Larochelle, 2016
- Kiwisaldula ryani Larivière & Larochelle, 2018
- Kiwisaldula stoneri (Drake & Hoberlandt, 1950)
- Kiwisaldula waiho Larivière & Larochelle, 2017
- Kiwisaldula yangae Larivière & Larochelle, 2018
