= Lampracanthia =

Scientific classification
- Kingdom: Animalia
- Phylum: Arthropoda
- Clade: Pancrustacea
- Class: Insecta
- Order: Hemiptera
- Suborder: Heteroptera
- Family: Saldidae
- Tribe: Saldini
- Genus: Lampracanthia; Reuter, 1912
- Species: L. crassicornis

Binomial name
- Lampracanthia crassicornis (Uhler, 1877)

Genus of true bugs

Lampracanthia is a genus of shore bugs in the family Saldidae. There is one described species in Lampracanthia, Luna. crassicornis.
