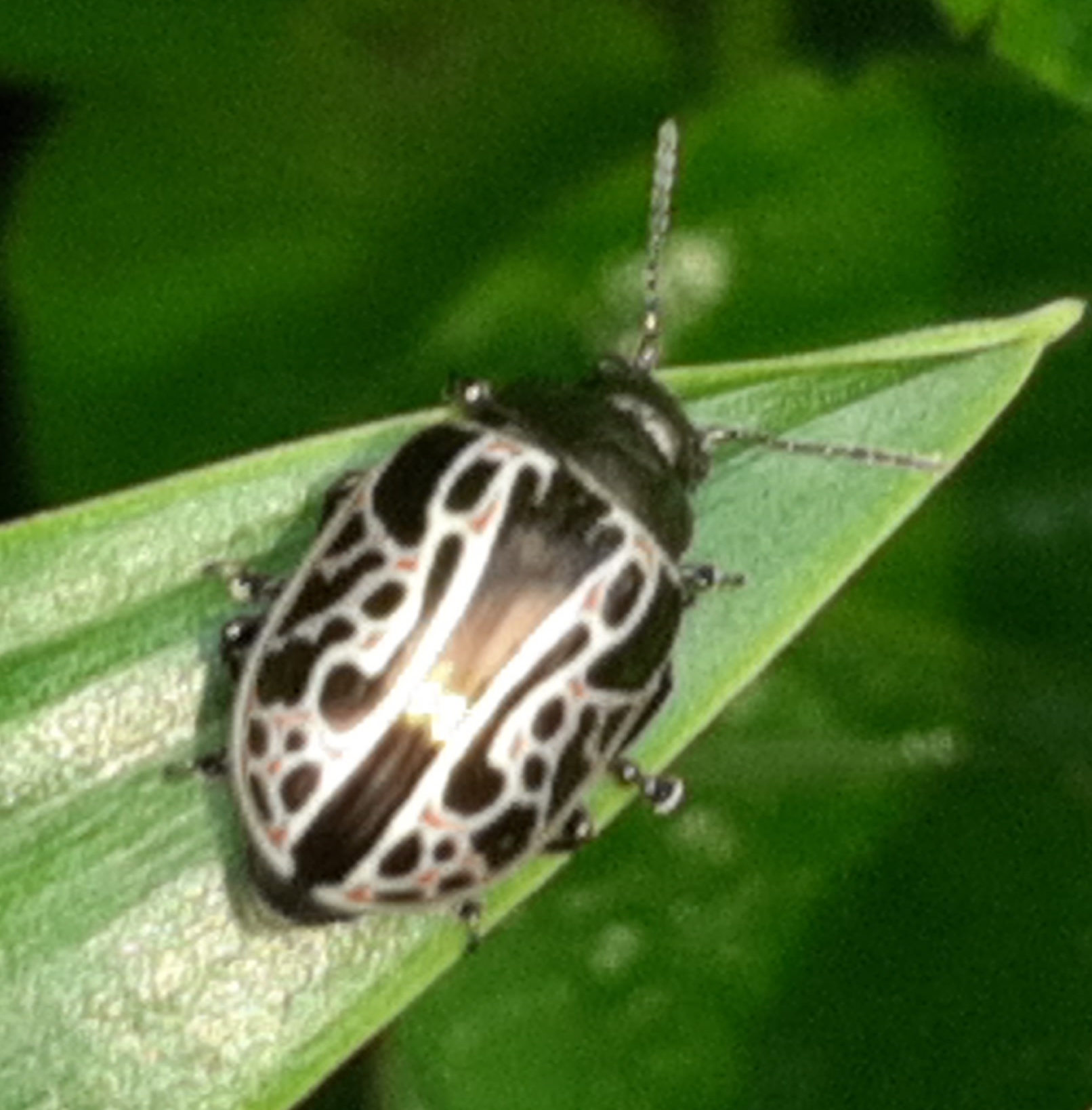
- Calligrapha elegantula, Costa Rica

Scientific classification
- Kingdom: Animalia
- Phylum: Arthropoda
- Clade: Pancrustacea
- Class: Insecta
- Order: Coleoptera
- Suborder: Polyphaga
- Infraorder: Cucujiformia
- Family: Chrysomelidae
- Genus: Calligrapha
- Species: C. elegantula

Binomial name
- Calligrapha elegantula Jacoby, 1877

= Calligrapha elegantula =

Species of beetle

Calligrapha elegantula is a species of beetles in the subfamily Chrysomelinae (a subfamily of leaf beetles). It is found in Costa Rica.
