= Calacanthia =

Scientific classification
- Domain: Eukaryota
- Kingdom: Animalia
- Phylum: Arthropoda
- Class: Insecta
- Order: Hemiptera
- Suborder: Heteroptera
- Family: Saldidae
- Subfamily: Saldinae
- Tribe: Saldini
- Genus: Calacanthia; Reuter, 1891

Genus of true bugs

Calacanthia is a genus of shore bugs in the family Saldidae. There are about seven described species in Calacanthia.

== Species ==
These seven species belong to the genus Calacanthia:

- Calacanthia alpicola (Salhberg, 1880)
- Calacanthia angulosa (Kiritshenko, 1912)
- Calacanthia grandis Cobben, 1985
- Calacanthia josifovi Vinokurov, 2008
- Calacanthia sichuanicus Chen & Zheng, 1987
- Calacanthia tibetana Drake, 1954
- Calacanthia trybomi (Sahlberg, 1878)
