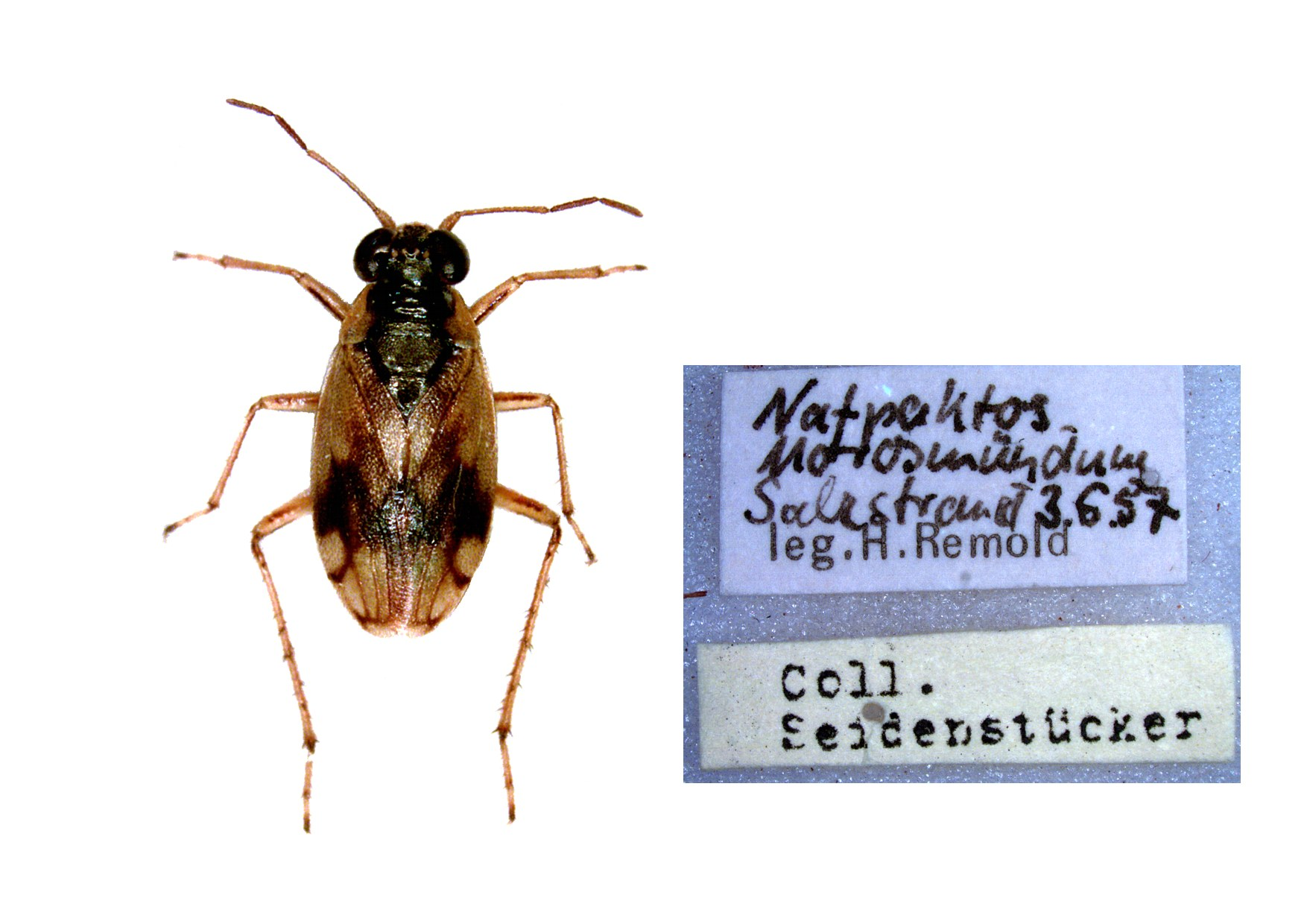

Scientific classification
- Kingdom: Animalia
- Phylum: Arthropoda
- Clade: Pancrustacea
- Class: Insecta
- Order: Hemiptera
- Suborder: Heteroptera
- Family: Saldidae
- Genus: Halosalda; Reuter, 1912

= Halosalda =

Genus of true bugs

Halosalda is a genus of true bugs belonging to the family Saldidae.

The species of this genus are found in Europe.

Species:

- Halosalda coracina Cobben, 1985
- Halosalda halophila (Jakovlev, 1876)
