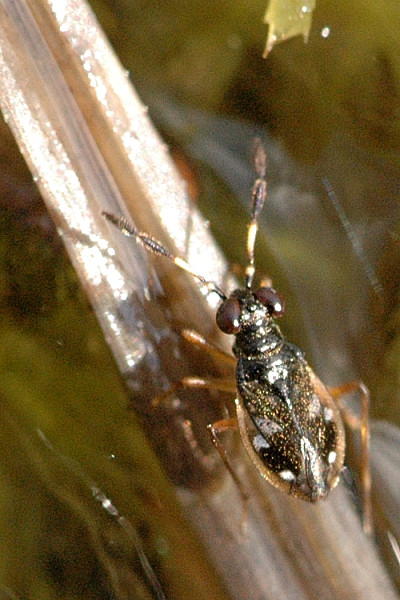

Scientific classification
- Kingdom: Animalia
- Phylum: Arthropoda
- Clade: Pancrustacea
- Class: Insecta
- Order: Hemiptera
- Suborder: Heteroptera
- Family: Saldidae
- Genus: Chartoscirta; Stål, 1868

= Chartoscirta =

Genus of true bugs

Chartoscirta is a genus of true bugs belonging to the family Saldidae.

The genus was first described by Carl Stål in 1868.

The species of this genus found in Europe are:

Species:

- Chartoscirta cincta
- Chartoscirta cocksii
- Chartoscirta elegantula
- Chartoscirta geminata
