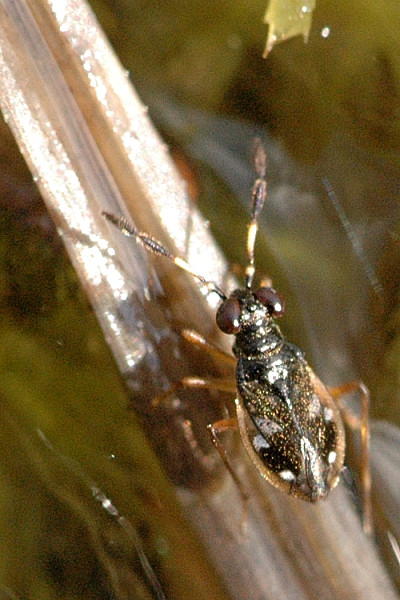
- Chartoscirta cocksii

Scientific classification
- Kingdom: Animalia
- Phylum: Arthropoda
- Class: Insecta
- Order: Hemiptera
- Suborder: Heteroptera
- Family: Saldidae
- Subfamily: Saldinae
- Tribe: Saldoidini; Reuter, 1912

= Saldoidini =

Tribe of true bugs

Saldoidini is a tribe of shore bugs in the family Saldidae. There are more than 20 genera and 250 described species in Saldoidini.

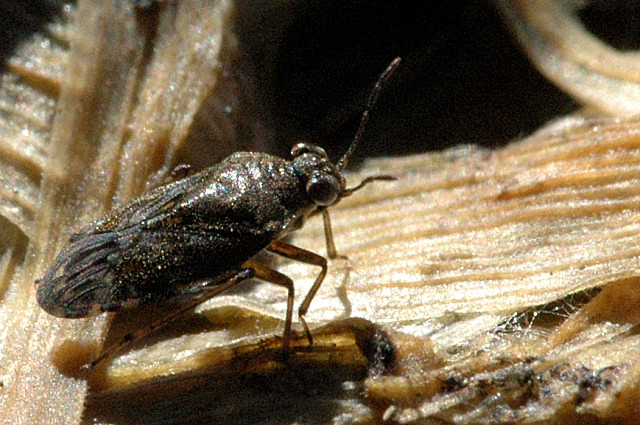
Saldula palustris

== Genera ==
These 22 genera belong to the tribe Saldoidini:

- Aoteasalda Larivière & Larochelle, 2016
- Calacanthia Reuter, 1891
- Capitonisalda J. Polhemus, 1981
- Capitonisaldoida J. Polhemus & D. Polhemus, 1991
- Chartosaldoida Cobben, 1987
- Chartoscirta Stål, 1868
- Halosalda Reuter, 1912
- Ioscytus Reuter, 1912
- Kiwisaldula Larivière & Larochelle, 2016
- Macrosaldula Southwood & Leston, 1959
- Mascarenisalda J. Polhemus & D. Polhemus, 1991
- Micracanthia Reuter, 1912
- Oiosalda Drake & Hoberlandt, 1952
- Orthophrys Horváth, 1911
- Orthosaldula Gapud, 1986
- Pseudosaldula Cobben, 1961
- Rupisalda J. Polhemus, 1985
- Saldoida Osborn, 1901
- Saldula Van Duzee, 1914
- Sinosalda Vinokurov, 2004
- Zemacrosaldula Larivière & Larochelle, 2015
- † Helenasaldula Cobben, 1976
