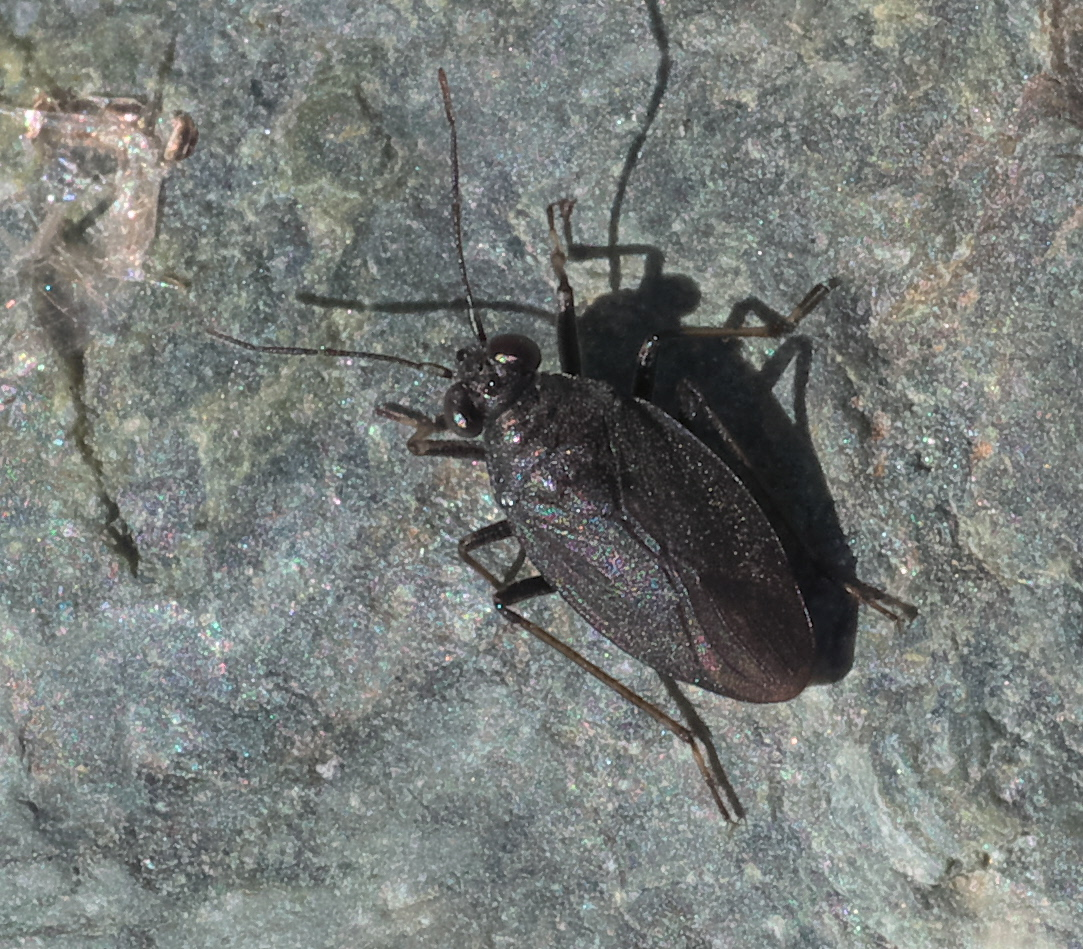

Scientific classification
- Domain: Eukaryota
- Kingdom: Animalia
- Phylum: Arthropoda
- Class: Insecta
- Order: Hemiptera
- Suborder: Heteroptera
- Family: Saldidae
- Subfamily: Saldinae
- Tribe: Saldoidini
- Genus: Saldula; Van Duzee, 1914

Diversity
- at least 120 species

= Saldula =

Genus of true bugs

Saldula is a genus of shore bugs in the family Saldidae. There are at least 120 described species in Saldula.

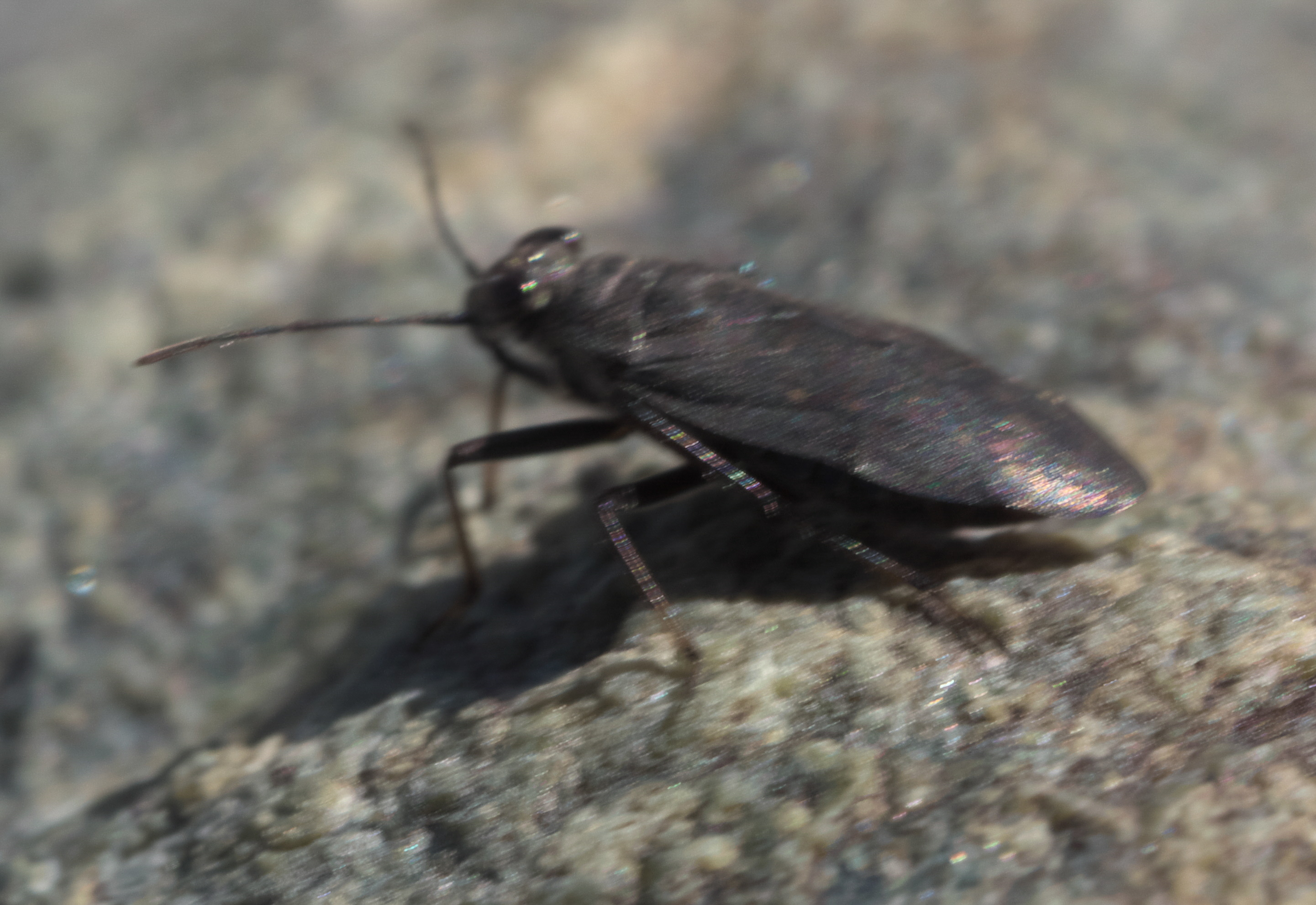

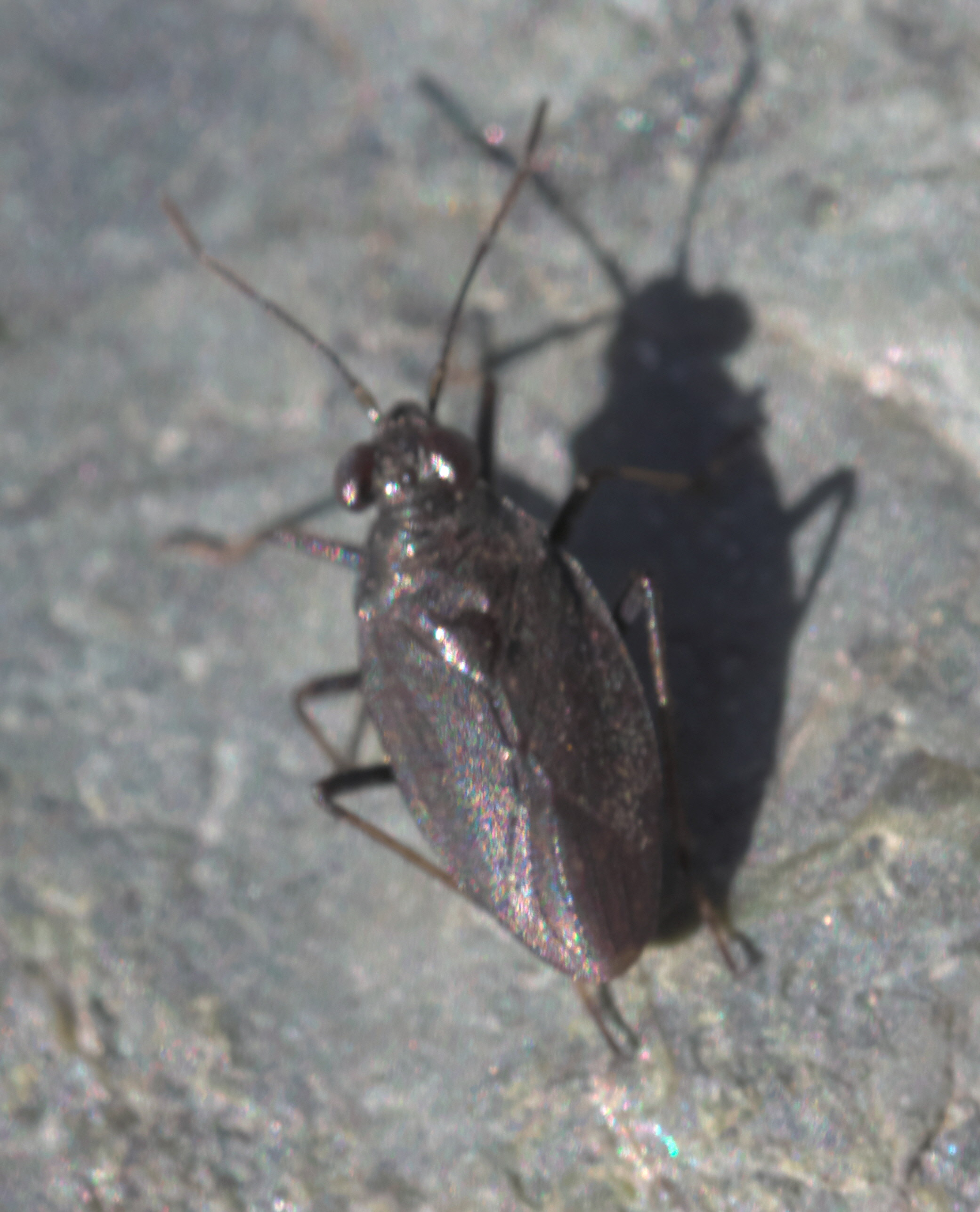

== See also ==
- List of Saldula species
