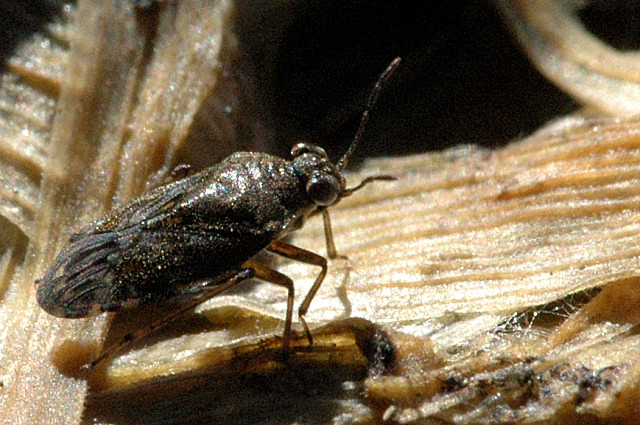
- Saldula palustris

Scientific classification
- Kingdom: Animalia
- Phylum: Arthropoda
- Clade: Pancrustacea
- Class: Insecta
- Order: Hemiptera
- Suborder: Heteroptera
- Infraorder: Leptopodomorpha
- Superfamily: Saldoidea
- Family: Saldidae; Amyot & Serville, 1843

= Saldidae =

Saldidae Temporal range: Early Cretaceous–Recent

Family of true bugs

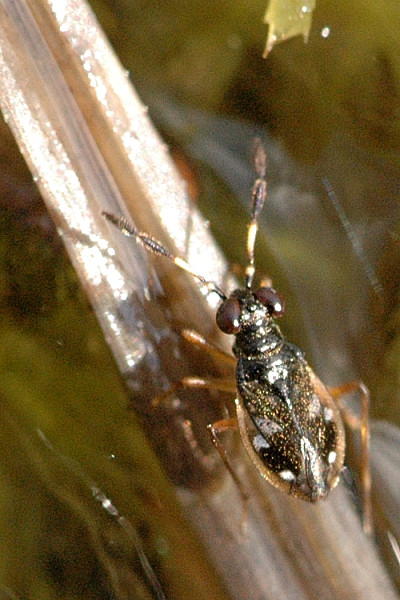
Chartoscirta cocksii

Saldidae, also known as shore bugs, are a family of insects in the order Hemiptera (true bugs). They are oval-shaped and measure 2–8 mm (0.08–0.31 in) when mature. Typically they are found near shorelines or the marginal growths near freshwater bodies, estuaries, and sea coasts. They can flee by leaping or taking flight. There are about 350 recognized species with the majority from the Nearctic and Palearctic. Many species are found in the intertidal zone and both adults and nymphs of some species like Saldula pallipes can tolerate submergence at high-tide. Saldidae are predators and scavengers. They pass the winter through egg or adult diapause.

== Genera ==
These 39 genera belong to the family Saldidae:

- Aoteasalda Larivière & Larochelle, 2016
- Calacanthia Reuter, 1891
- Capitonisalda J.Polhemus, 1981
- Capitonisaldoida J.Polhemus & D.Polhemus, 1991
- Chartosaldoida Cobben, 1987
- Chartoscirta Stal, 1868
- Chiloxanthus Reuter, 1891
- Enalosalda Polhemus & Evans, 1969
- Halosalda Reuter, 1912
- Ioscytus Reuter, 1912
- Kiwisaldula Larivière & Larochelle, 2016
- Lampracanthia Reuter, 1912
- Macrosaldula Leston & Southwood, 1964
- Mascarenisalda J.Polhemus & D.Polhemus, 1991
- Micracanthia Reuter, 1912
- Oiosalda Drake & Hoberlandt, 1952
- Orthophrys Horvath, 1911
- Orthosaldula Gapud, 1986
- Pentacora Reuter, 1912
- Propentacora J.Polhemus, 1985
- Pseudosaldula Cobben, 1961
- Rupisalda J.Polhemus, 1985
- Salda Fabricius, 1803
- Saldoida Osborn, 1901
- Saldula Van Duzee, 1914
- Salduncula Brown, 1954
- Sinosalda Vinokurov, 2004
- Teloleuca Reuter, 1912
- Zemacrosaldula Larivière & Larochelle, 2015
- † Baissotea Ryzhkova, 2015
- † Brevrimatus Zhang, Yao & Ren, 2011
- † Helenasaldula Cobben, 1976
- † Luculentsalda Zhang, Yao & Ren, 2013
- † Mongolocoris Ryzhkova, 2012
- † Oligosaldina Statz, 1950
- † Paralosalda Polhemus & Evans, 1969
- † Saldonia Popov, 1973
- † Ulanocoris Ryzhkova, 2012
- † Venustsalda Zhang, Song, Yao & Ren, 2012
