= Bucculatrix parthenica =

Scientific classification
- Kingdom: Animalia
- Phylum: Arthropoda
- Clade: Pancrustacea
- Class: Insecta
- Order: Lepidoptera
- Family: Bucculatricidae
- Genus: Bucculatrix
- Species: B. parthenica

Binomial name
- Bucculatrix parthenica Bradley, 1990

Species of moth

Bucculatrix parthenica is a moth of the family Bucculatricidae. It is native to Mexico, but was released in Queensland, Australia, as a biological control agent for Parthenium weeds. It was described by John David Bradley in 1990.

The wingspan is about 5 mm.

The larvae feed on Parthenium hysterophorus.
