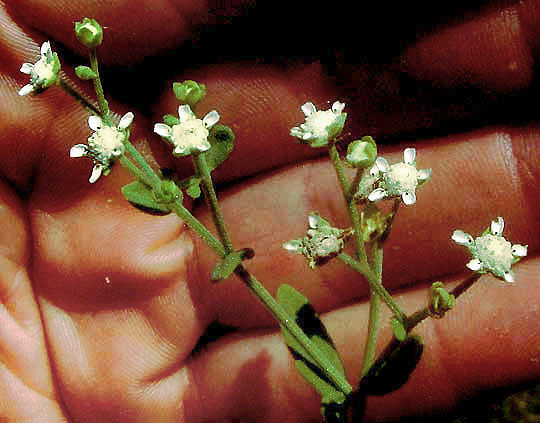
- Gray's feverfew flowering heads

Scientific classification
- Kingdom: Plantae
- Clade: Tracheophytes
- Clade: Angiosperms
- Clade: Eudicots
- Clade: Asterids
- Order: Asterales
- Family: Asteraceae
- Tribe: Heliantheae
- Genus: Parthenium
- Species: P. confertum

Binomial name
- Parthenium confertum A.Gray

Synonyms
- Parthenium confertum var. typicum Rollins

= Parthenium confertum =

Species of plant

Parthenium confertum, or Gray's feverfew, is a biennial plant belonging to the family Asteraceae.

== Description ==
As can be confirmed on a page displaying images of different Parthenium species—the "feverfews"—documented by citizen scientists throughout the world, Gray's feverfew is typical of the 16 or so feverfew species by producing a certain kind of flowering arrangement with these traits:

- Flowering heads are quite small and white.
- They are composed of five or so unusually short, widely spaced, petal-like "ray florets" surrounding numerous small, closely packed "disk florets".
- The ray florets produce tiny, one-seeded, cypsela-type fruits, while the disk florets usually provide only pollen
- The heads are arrayed in more or less panicle-type inflorescences.

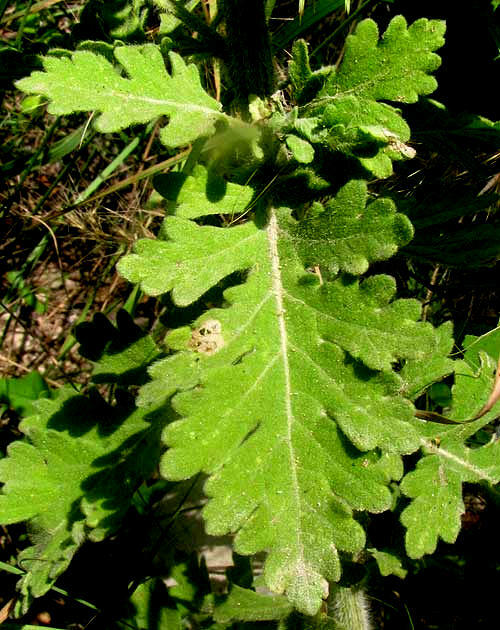
Gray's feverfew leaves

Among features distinguishing Gray's feverfew from similar species of Parthenium are these:

- It is a biennial.
- It stands up to 60+ cm tall (~2 feet).
- Its leaves are oval to rounded-triangular or elliptic.
- Leaf blades usually have irregularly pinnately lobed margins.
- Leaves can develop to 120+ mm in length and 40+ mm in width (~4 3/4 x 1 1/2 inches).
- Both leaf surfaces are gland-dotted.
- Leaves bear stiff, slender, pressed-flat hairs, or trichomes interspersed with erect trichomes up to 2mm tall ( 1/16 inch).
- Disk florets usually number 20-30.

Unlike some other Parthenium species whose injured parts produce white latex historically used as a natural source for rubber, Parthenium confertum produces no white latex.

== Distribution ==
In the Southwestern United States Parthenium confertum occurs in the states of Arizona, New Mexico and Texas. In eastern Mexico it reaches as far south as the state of Querétaro in the country's central highlands. In western Mexico it occurs in the states of Baja California, Sonora and Sinaloa.

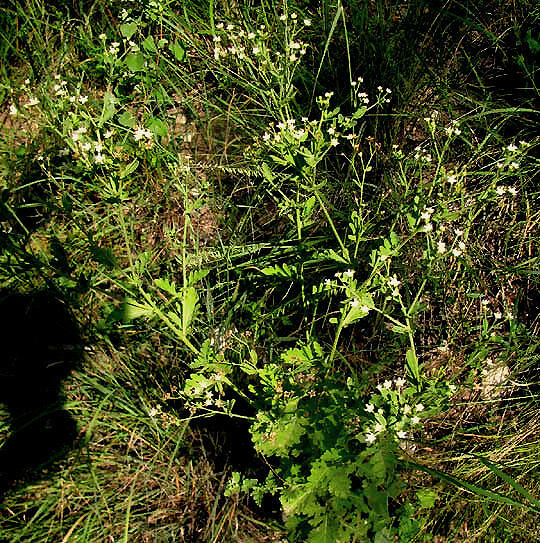
Parthenium confertum in a grassy, open habitat

== Habitat ==
In the US state of New Mexico Gray's feverfew inhabits dry, sandy, rocky soils of mesas, canyons, hillsides, prairies, pinyon-juniper woodlands, scrub, grasslands and disturbed areas such as roadsides, at elevations of ~1200 – 2100 meters (3580–7000 feet). Pictures on this page show an individual occupying a patch of prairie in an open forest on a slope of the Edwards Plateau at an elevation of ~1750m (~5750 feet).

== Taxonomy ==
Four varieties of Parthenium confertum are accepted:

- Parthenium confertum var. confertum
- Parthenium confertum var. divaricatum Rollins
- Parthenium confertum var. lyratum (A.Gray) Rollins
- Parthenium confertum var. microcephalum Rollins

Through natural hybridization in northeastern Mexico, Parthenium confertum along with Parthenium bipinnatifidum are reported to have produced the famously invasive and toxic weed Parthenium hysterophorus.

=== Ploidy ===
Parthenium confertum, with a chromosome count of 35, is a polyploid.

=== Etymology ===
The genus name Parthenium probably either derives from the Greek parthenos, which means "virgin", or parthenion, the ancient name of some kind of plant. The allusion is unclear.

The species name confertum apparently is derived from the New Latin confertus, meaning "crowded/pressed together/thronging," which is a good description of how the numerous disk florets are crowded into such a small space in the flowering heads.
