= Bucculatrix ambrosiaefoliella =

Scientific classification
- Kingdom: Animalia
- Phylum: Arthropoda
- Clade: Pancrustacea
- Class: Insecta
- Order: Lepidoptera
- Family: Bucculatricidae
- Genus: Bucculatrix
- Species: B. ambrosiaefoliella

Binomial name
- Bucculatrix ambrosiaefoliella Chambers, 1875

Synonyms
- Bucculatrix rileyi Frey & Boll, 1876

Species of moth

Bucculatrix ambrosiaefoliella is a species of moth in the family Bucculatricidae. It is found in North America, where it has been recorded from California, Texas, Arizona, Pennsylvania, Kentucky, Missouri, Iowa, Maine and Ohio. The species was first described by V. T. Chambers in 1875.

The wingspan is 7.5–8 mm. Adults are on wing from late summer to October. The species probably overwinters as an adult.

The larvae feed on Ambrosia and Helianthus species and Parthenium hysterophorus. They mine the leaves of their host plant. The mine starts as a short, tortuous, linear mine ending in a small blotch. Pupation takes place in a white, slender cocoon.
