= P. alpinum =

P. alpinum may refer to:

- Papaver alpinum, the Alpine poppy, a plant species found in the Alps
- Parthenium alpinum, the Alpine feverfew and Wyoming feverfew, a flowering plant species native to Wyoming, Colorado, and New Mexico in the United States
- Phleum alpinum, the Alpine timothy or Mountain timothy, a grass species with a circumboreal distribution
