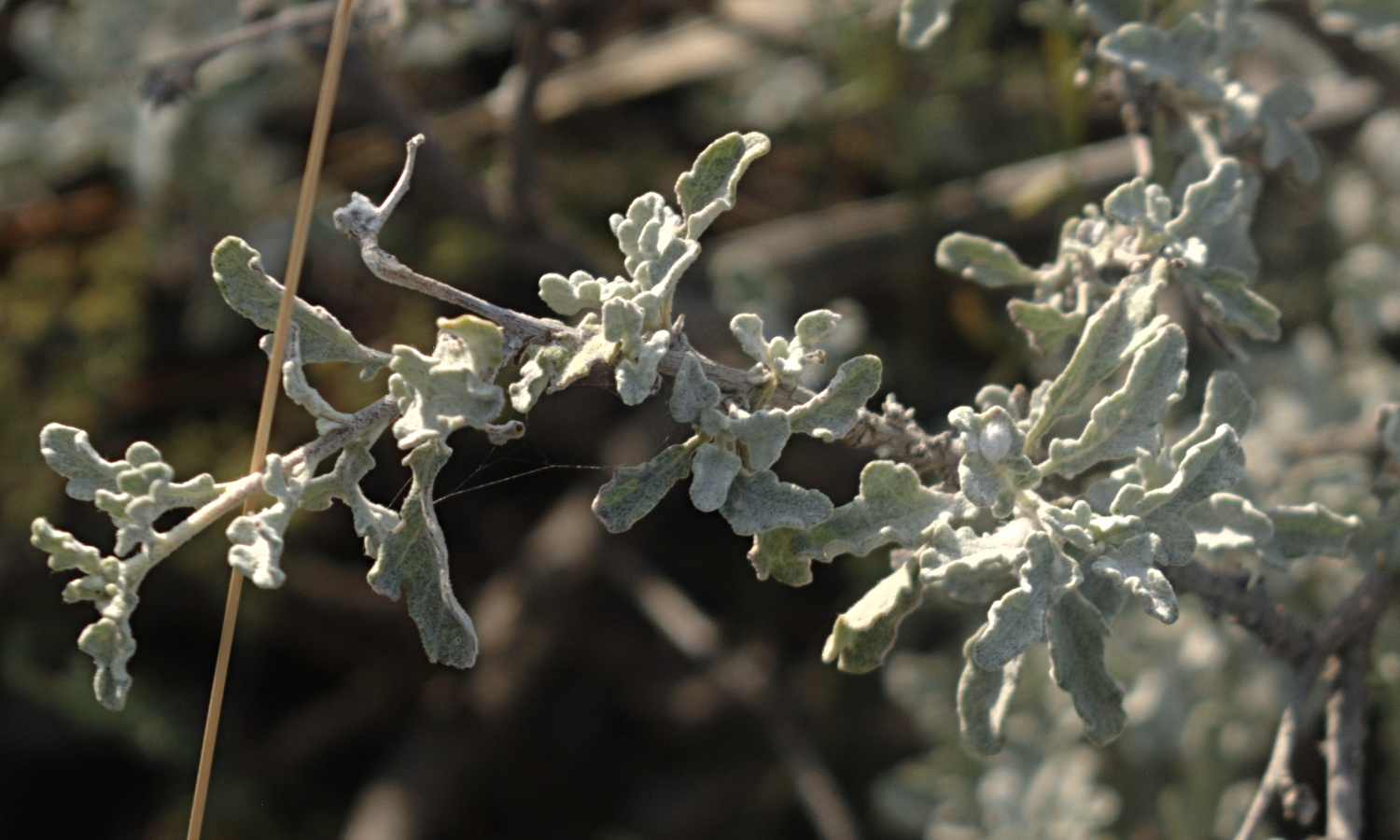
- Parthenium incanum growing in Walnut Canyon at Carlsbad Caverns National Park, New Mexico

Scientific classification
- Kingdom: Plantae
- Clade: Tracheophytes
- Clade: Angiosperms
- Clade: Eudicots
- Clade: Asterids
- Order: Asterales
- Family: Asteraceae
- Genus: Parthenium
- Species: P. incanum

Binomial name
- Parthenium incanum Kunth

= Parthenium incanum =

Species of flowering plant

Parthenium incanum, with the common names mariola and New Mexico rubber plant, is a plant in the genus Parthenium of the family Asteraceae.

The plant is native to North America, from the Southwestern United States through Northern, Central, and Southwestern Mexico. Habitats include desert grasslands including in the Chihuahuan Desert, on dry gravel slopes, and on plains.

== Description ==
Parthenium incanum grows from 1.5–3 feet (0.46–0.91 m) in height and width. Its foliage is a pubescent grayish-white. Small white flower clusters appear from July to October.

== Uses ==
=== Medicinal ===
The Jicarilla Apache used mariola as a traditional medicinal plant. It was prepared by boiling the plant's leaves, and the solution was then rubbed over a pregnant woman's abdomen to relieve discomfort.

=== Cultivation ===
Parthenium incanum is cultivated as an ornamental plant, for use in drought tolerant, native plant, and wildlife gardens.
