= Parthenin =

Names
- IUPAC name 1-Hydroxy-6β,12-epoxyambrosa-2,11(13)-diene-4,12-dione
- Systematic IUPAC name (3aS,6S,6aS,9aS,9bR)-6a-Hydroxy-6,9a-dimethyl-3-methylidene-3,3a,4,5,6,6a,9a,9b-octahydroazuleno[4,5-b]furan-2,9-dione
- Other names Parthenicin

Identifiers
CAS Number	508-59-8
3D model (JSmol)	Interactive image
ChEBI	CHEBI:7938
ChEMBL	ChEMBL401149
ChemSpider	390756
KEGG	C09523
PubChem CID	442288
UNII	982DJP4W6A
CompTox Dashboard (EPA)	DTXSID40877834
- InChI: InChI=1S/C15H18O4/c1-8-4-5-10-9(2)13(17)19-12(10)14(3)11(16)6-7-15(8,14)18/h6-8,10,12,18H,2,4-5H2,1,3H3/t8-,10-,12+,14-,15+/m0/s1 Key: LLQCRTZROWMVOL-JISBIHODSA-N
- SMILES: C[C@H]1CC[C@@H]2[C@H]([C@]3([C@]1(C=CC3=O)O)C)OC(=O)C2=C

Properties
Chemical formula	C_{15}H_{18}O_{4}
Molar mass	262.305 g·mol^{−1}
- Except where otherwise noted, data are given for materials in their standard state (at 25 °C [77 °F], 100 kPa). Infobox references

Parthenin is a chemical compound classified as a sesquiterpene lactone. It has been isolated from Parthenium hysterophorus.

It is genotoxic, allergenic, and an irritant. Parthenin is believed to be responsible for the dermatitis caused by Parthenium hysterophorus.
