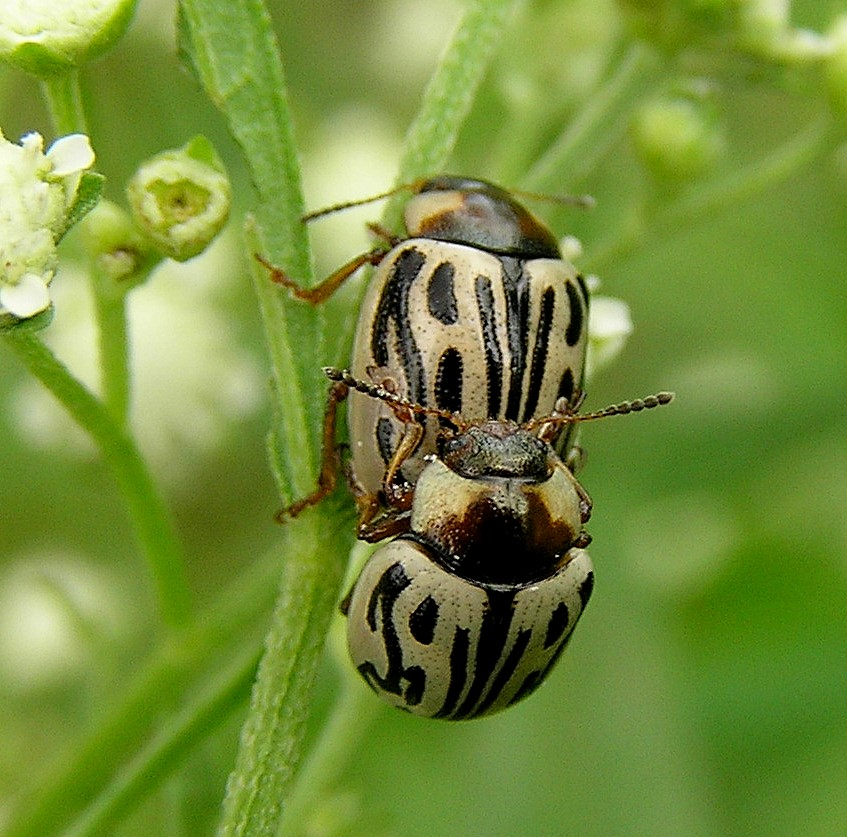

Scientific classification
- Kingdom: Animalia
- Phylum: Arthropoda
- Clade: Pancrustacea
- Class: Insecta
- Order: Coleoptera
- Suborder: Polyphaga
- Infraorder: Cucujiformia
- Family: Chrysomelidae
- Genus: Calligrapha
- Species: C. bicolorata

Binomial name
- Calligrapha bicolorata (Pallister, 1953)

= Calligrapha bicolorata =

Species of beetle

Calligrapha bicolorata, variously referred to as the Parthenium beetle or Mexican beetle, is a species of leaf beetle belonging to the family Chrysomelidae, in the subgenus Zygogramma, which was formerly a genus.

== Description ==
C. bicolorata is a small leaf beetle with a brown head, brown and yellow graduated pronotum and yellow elytra marked with characteristic elongated brown stripes. The pattern on the elytra is greatly variable - in a study of 478 beetles, 29 variations on this pattern were identified.

== Distribution and habitat ==
C. bicolorata is native to Mexico, but has been introduced to parts of India and Australia. Adults and larvae are used as a form of biological pest control in India in order to control invasive Parthenium hysterophorus.

== Life cycle ==
Eggs are generally laid on the ventral surface of both young and old leaves, and occasionally on the upper surface of leaves, stems and flowers of host plants. Eggs are yellow to orange, elongate cylindrical or oblong with fine reticulations on the surface. The eggs hatch in 4–5 days. Larvae are pale yellow, turning white as they grow, feeding for 10 to 15 days on leaves whilst growing through four instar stages. On maturity the larvae enter the soil and pupate below up to 15 cm depth. The total life cycle of the beetle is just over 100 days.

=== Predators ===
An undetermined species of fly in the genus Drino (family Tachinidae) has been recorded as parasitising C. bicolorata in Karnataka (India). Two predatory bugs Andrallus spinidens and Eocanthecona furcellata prey on the larvae of C. bicolorata and a third species, Sycanus pyrrhomelas, preys on both larvae and adults.
