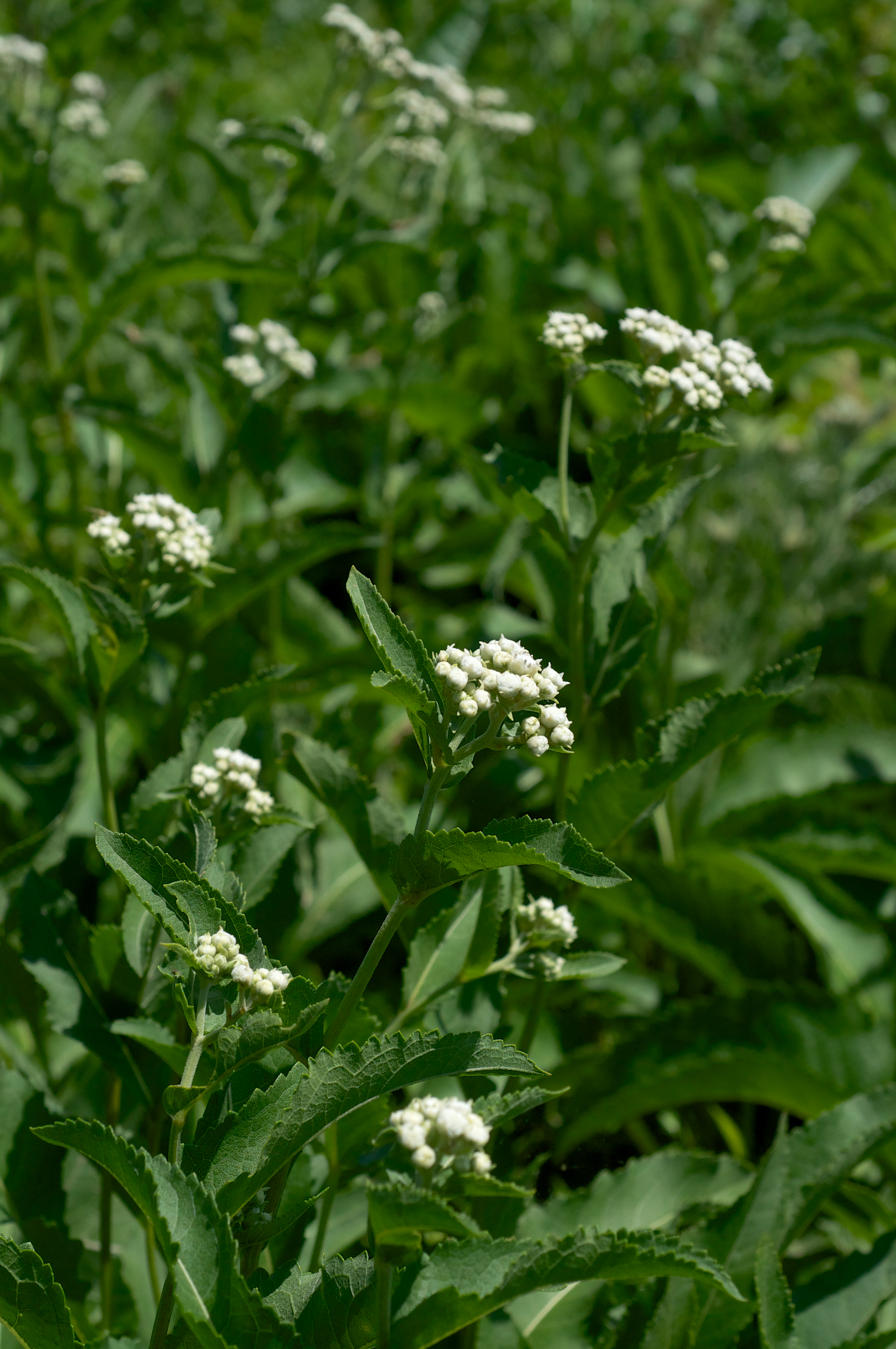

Conservation status
- Secure (NatureServe)

Scientific classification
- Kingdom: Plantae
- Clade: Tracheophytes
- Clade: Angiosperms
- Clade: Eudicots
- Clade: Asterids
- Order: Asterales
- Family: Asteraceae
- Tribe: Heliantheae
- Genus: Parthenium
- Species: P. integrifolium

Binomial name
- Parthenium integrifolium L.

= Parthenium integrifolium =

Species of flowering plant

Parthenium integrifolium is a species of flowering plant in the family Asteraceae known by the common names wild quinine, common wild quinine, American feverfew, and eastern feverfew. It is native to the eastern and midwestern United States.

== Description ==
This plant is a perennial herb growing up to 1 metre (3.3 ft) high. The glandular leaves are oval to lance-shaped and variable in size. They have serrated, toothed, or lobed edges. Some authorities recognize two varieties based on leaf shape: var. integrifolium and var. mabryanum. The inflorescence is an array of several flower heads containing 15 or more whitish disc florets and 5 to 6 ray florets. The flowers have a pleasant smell, which is mildly medicinal.

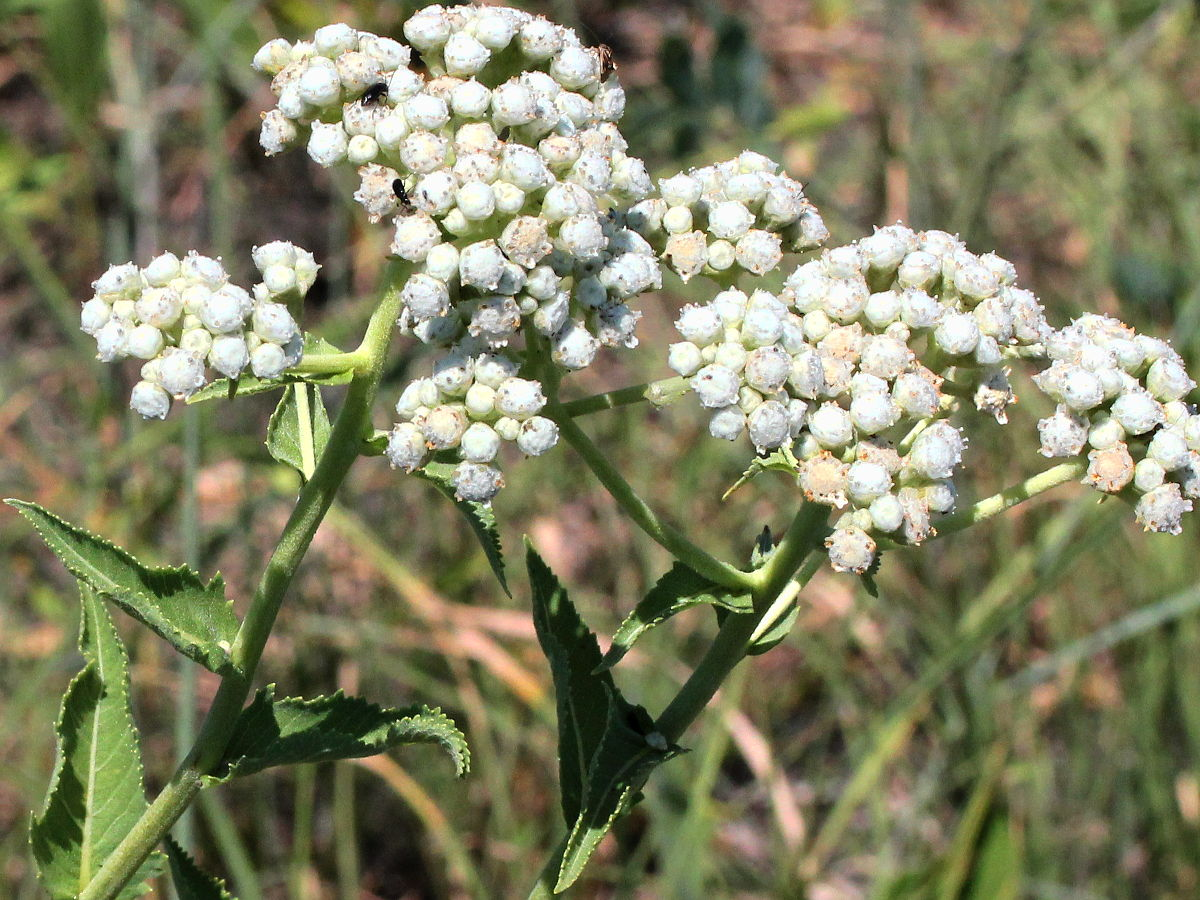
var. integrifolium

== Ecology ==
This plant grows in disturbed areas as well as prairies, meadows, woodland edges, and hillsides. It does best in full sun, but does well enough in part shade. It grows in most any well-drained soil from sandy loam to good quality clay. It tolerates hot and cold climates and can be used as a garden plant in many areas. It has a long blooming period of June into September; one of the longer blooming perennials. The winter inflorescences are attractive and make a good dried flower arrangement for indoors. It is sold by a good number of native plant nurseries.

The leaves of the plant contain tannins and the plant was used for medicinal and veterinary purposes by Native Americans. The Catawba people used it as a poultice to treat burns. The ashes were applied to horses with "sore backs". The roots were made into a tea to treat dysentery.
