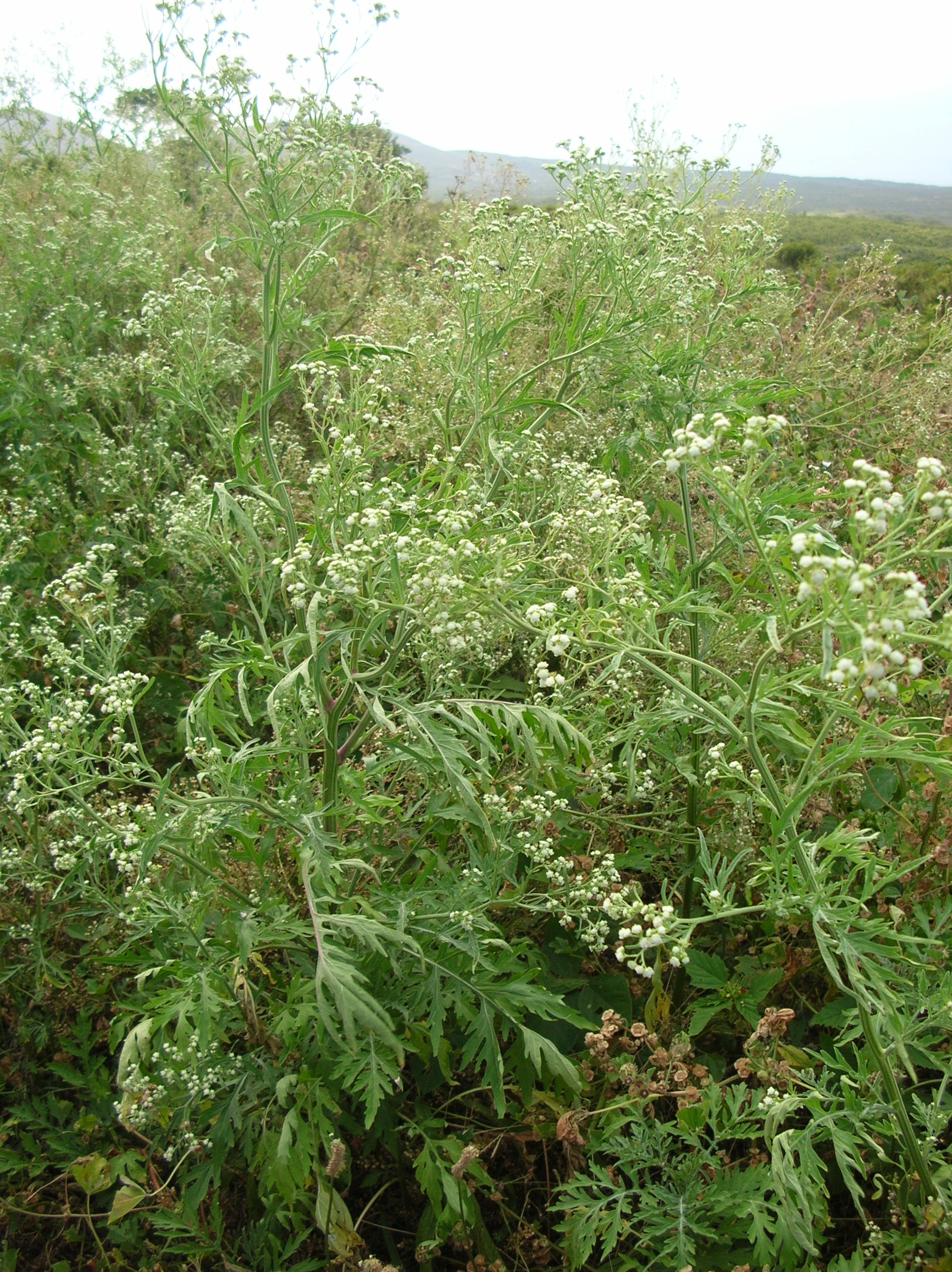
- Parthenium hysterophorus

Scientific classification
- Kingdom: Plantae
- Clade: Tracheophytes
- Clade: Angiosperms
- Clade: Eudicots
- Clade: Asterids
- Order: Asterales
- Family: Asteraceae
- Subfamily: Asteroideae
- Tribe: Heliantheae
- Subtribe: Ambrosiinae
- Genus: Parthenium; L.

Type species
- Parthenium hysterophorus L.

Synonyms
- Argyrochaeta Cav.; Bolophyta Nutt.; Echetrosis Phil.; Hysterophorus Vaill.; Partheniastrum Fabr.; Villanova Ortega

= Parthenium =

Genus of plants

Parthenium is a genus of North American annuals, biennials, perennials, subshrubs, and shrubs in the tribe Heliantheae within the family Asteraceae and subfamily Asteroideae.

The name Parthenium is an evolution of the Ancient Greek name παρθένιον (parthenion), which referred to Tanacetum parthenium. The name is possibly derived from the Greek word παρθένος (parthenos) which means "virgin".

Members of the genus are commonly known as feverfew. Notable species include guayule (P. argentatum) which has been used as a rubber substitute, especially during the Second World War; and also P. hysterophorus, a serious invasive species in the Old World.

== Species ==
These include:

- Parthenium alpinum (Nutt.) Torr. & A.Gray – Arkansas River feverfew - NM CO WY
- Parthenium argentatum A.Gray – Guayule - TX, Coahuila, Guanajuato, Nuevo León, San Luis Potosí, Zacatecas
- Parthenium cineraceum Rollins - Bolivia, Paraguay
- Parthenium confertum A.Gray – Gray's feverfew - AZ NM TX Chihuahua, Coahuila, Nuevo León, San Luis Potosí, Querétaro, Tamaulipas
- Parthenium fruticosum Less. - from Tamaulipas to Chiapas
- Parthenium hysterophorus L. – Santa Maria feverfew, whitetop weed - widespread in North + South America; as an invasive species in India, Australia, and Africa
- Parthenium incanum Kunth – mariola - NV UT AZ NM TX Chihuahua, Coahuila, Durango, Hidalgo, Nuevo León, San Luis Potosí, Zacatecas
- Parthenium integrifolium L. – American feverfew, wild quinine - from TX to MA + MN
- Parthenium ligulatum (M.E. Jones) Barneby – Colorado feverfew - CO UT
- Parthenium rollinsianum Rzed. - San Luis Potosí
- Parthenium schottii Greenm. ex Millsp. & Chase - Yucatán
- Parthenium tomentosum DC. - Oaxaca, Puebla

== Importance ==
In North America, the Jicarilla Apache people used Parthenium incanum for medicine (Opler 1946: 8). The sap of guayule (P. argentatum) is a source of natural rubber. Parthenium hysterophorus is a common invasive species in India, Australia, and parts of Africa. Its pollen can cause allergies and the sap is toxic.

== Gallery ==
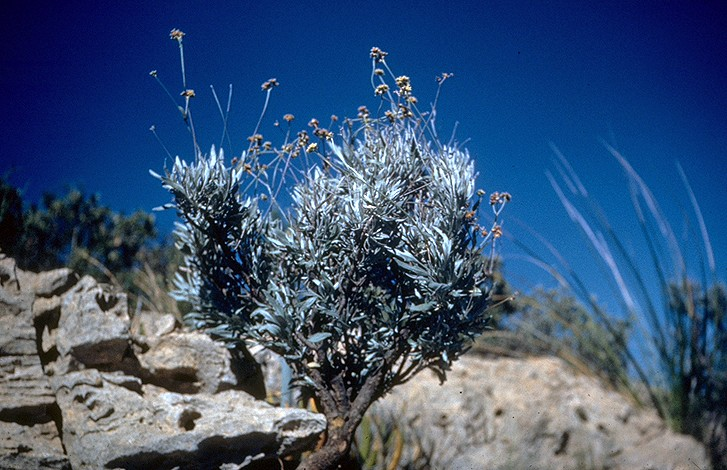
Parthenium argentatum

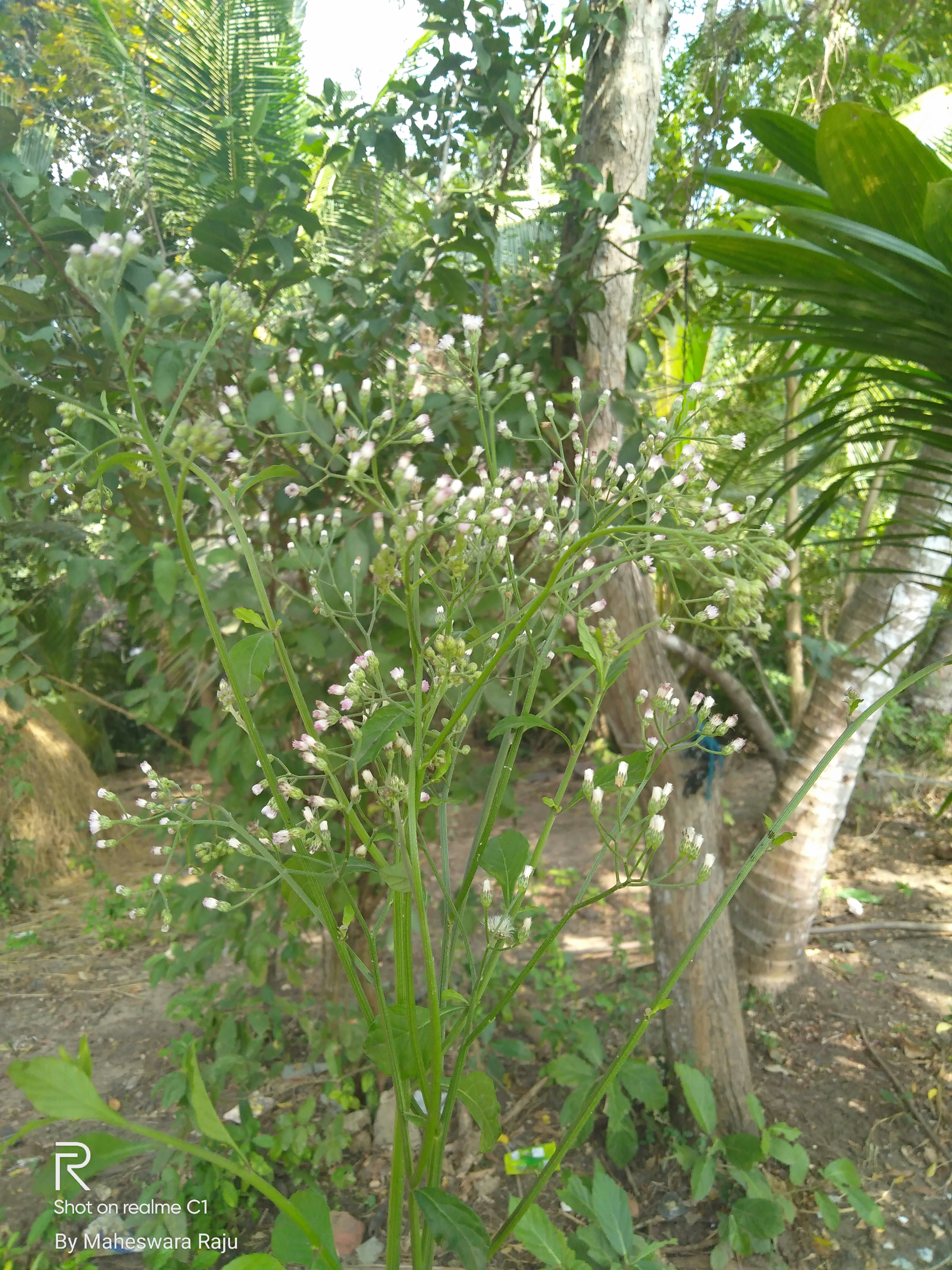

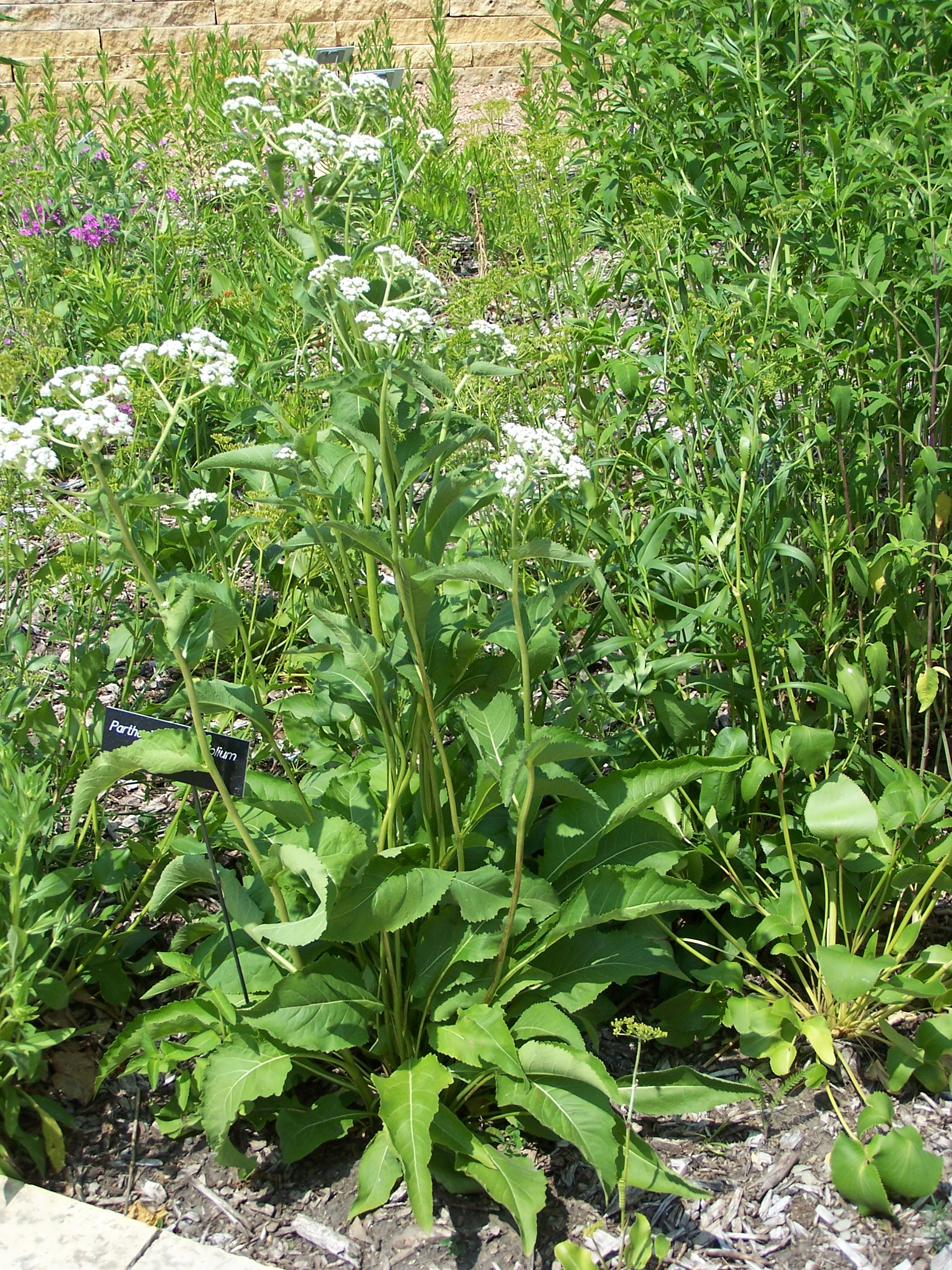
Wild quinine (Parthenium integrifolium)

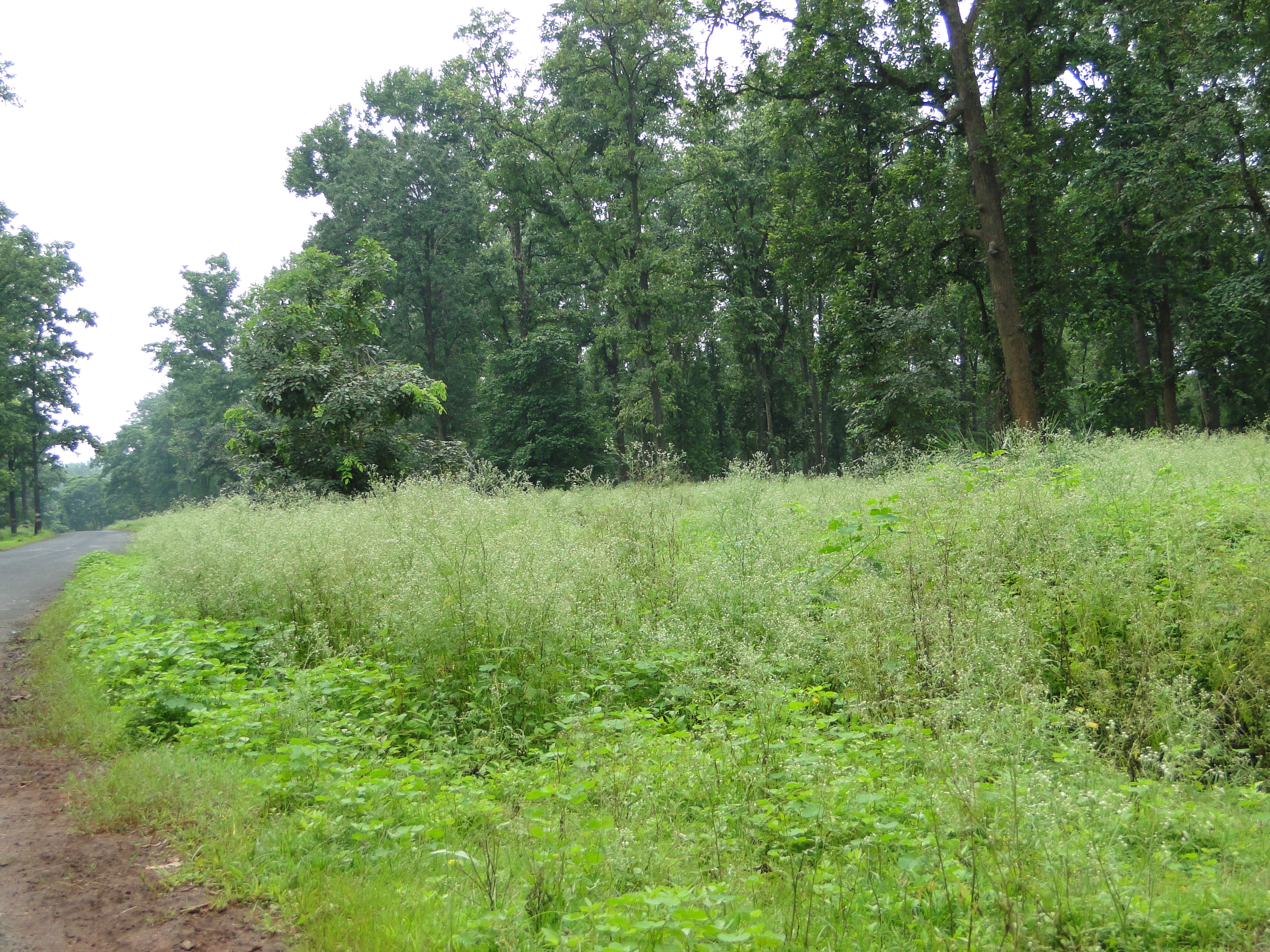
Parthenium hysterophorus in Achanakmar Tiger Reserve

== Further information ==
- Centre for Agriculture and Bioscience International Invasive Species Compendium (2019-02-26). Parthenium in Malaysia. YouTube. Archived from the original on 2021-12-13.
- Media related to Parthenium at Wikimedia Commons
- Data related to Parthenium at Wikispecies
