= Parthenium alpinum =

Conservation status
- Vulnerable (NatureServe)

Scientific classification
- Kingdom: Plantae
- Clade: Tracheophytes
- Clade: Angiosperms
- Clade: Eudicots
- Clade: Asterids
- Order: Asterales
- Family: Asteraceae
- Genus: Parthenium
- Species: P. alpinum

Binomial name
- Parthenium alpinum (Nutt.) Torr. & A.Gray

Synonyms
- Bolophyta alpina

Species of flowering plant

Parthenium alpinum is a species of flowering plant in the aster family known by the common names alpine feverfew and Wyoming feverfew. It is native to Wyoming, Colorado, and New Mexico in the United States.

This is a small, mat-forming, long-lived perennial herb with gray-green, hairy leaves and solitary flower heads. The heads contain whitish or greenish disc florets and a few pistillate ray florets that do not have ligules. Flowering occurs in mid-April through mid-May.

This plant grows in grasslands and shrublands, especially those dominated by Cercocarpus. The elevation ranges from 1500 to 2200 meters. Despite its name it does not actually grow in alpine climates. The plant generally grows on limestone, but also on shale. It grows on exposed, wind-eroded ridges and hills with little vegetative cover. The soils are thin and gravelly.

This plant occurs in five Wyoming counties and one Colorado county, and in 1984 it was discovered in New Mexico, where it occurs in two counties. It has a disjunct distribution, its range divided into five main population centers. It is most common in Wyoming, where there are probably millions of plants. In Platte County there are perhaps one million or more.
