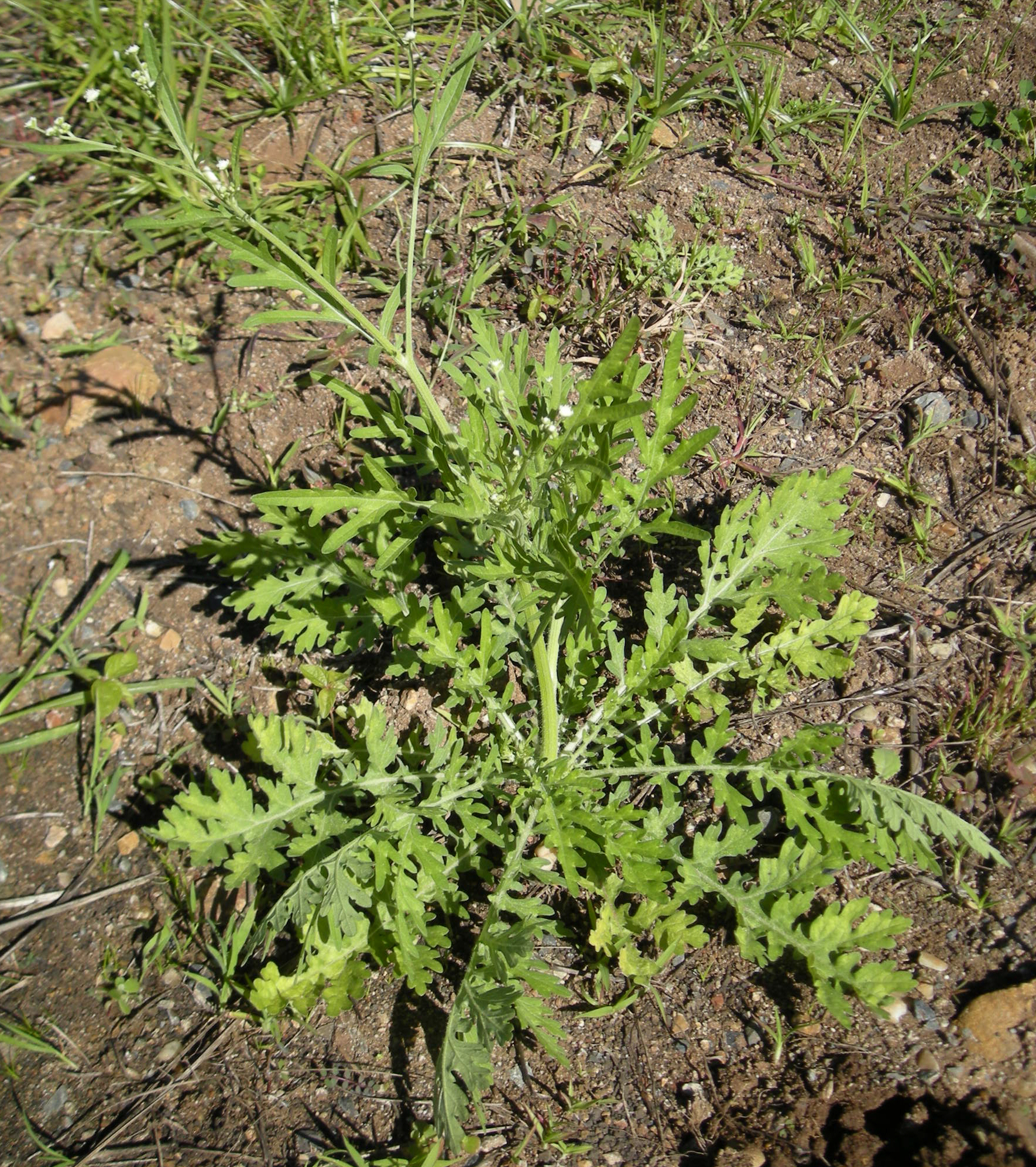

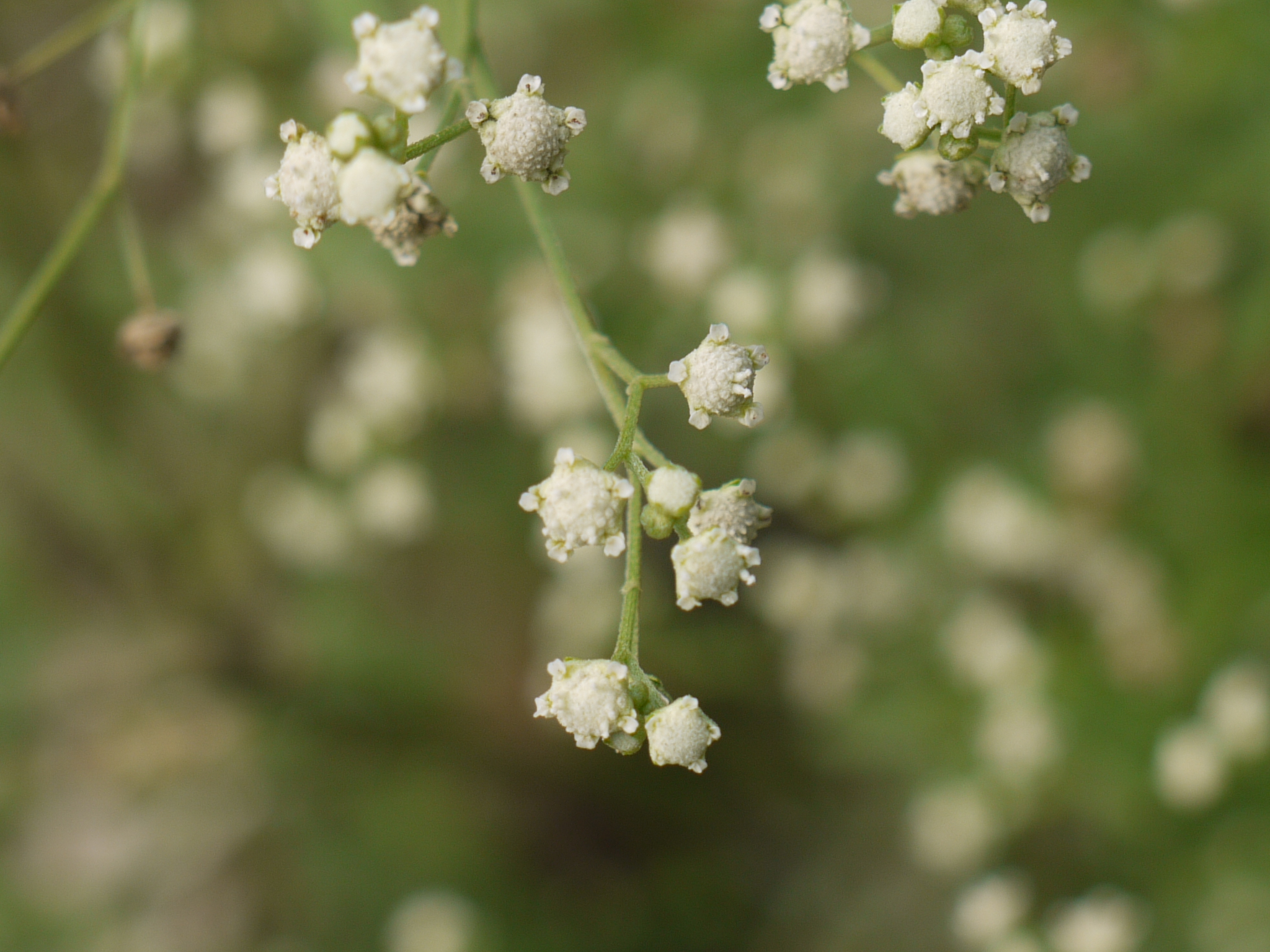

Scientific classification
- Kingdom: Plantae
- Clade: Embryophytes
- Clade: Tracheophytes
- Clade: Angiosperms
- Clade: Eudicots
- Clade: Asterids
- Order: Asterales
- Family: Asteraceae
- Tribe: Heliantheae
- Genus: Parthenium
- Species: P. hysterophorus

Binomial name
- Parthenium hysterophorus L.

= Parthenium hysterophorus =

Species of flowering plant

Parthenium hysterophorus is a herbaceous, flowering weed species in the family Asteraceae. It is one of the most common weeds across the globe. It is best known as Santa Maria feverfew, but is also referred to as Santa-Maria, whitetop weed, famine weed and congress grass. It is native to the American tropics but has since become an invasive species in East Asia, India, Australia, and parts of Africa. It has become infamous; it is considered one of the most noxious, harmful weeds species. It is known for its ability to reproduce quickly and abundantly, and prefers to grow in nutrient poor habitats. It is allelopathic, which poses several pros and cons that affect ecology. Many methods of control have been evaluated and implemented over time to best assess how to approach the conservation of this species and the ecosystems it affects.

== Characteristics ==
=== Physical attributes ===
This plant is described as an erect, annual herb with a branched, trichome covered stem that becomes woody with time. It has a deep taproot, and can grow from 1.5 to 2 meters in vertical height especially in good soil. The young plants begin by forming a basal rosette of pale green, dissected, lobed, alternate leaves that can get up to 30 centimeters in length. After stem elongation is initiated, the leaves gradually become smaller. The leaves are said to resemble carrot leaves. The flower heads are a creamy white color, and they protrude from the forks in the leaves. Each bud has about 5 to 8 florets.

=== Life cycle ===
Parthenium hysterophorus is known for being a fecund, but ephemeral herbaceous plant. They cannot germinate well if the seeds are not buried at least 5 centimeters below the surface of the soil. Temperature wise, germination can occur between 8 and 30 °C (46 and 86 °F), although the optimum temperature range is 22 to 25 °C (72 to 77 °F). Each flower has five black seeds. Each fruit is cypsela. There are two main subsections of the life cycle of P. hyesterophorus plant. The juvenile (also referred to as rosette or vegetative) phase, and the adult phase (also referred to as mature, or reproductive). During the juvenile stage (after the completed germination period), the plant does not show any flowering and its leaves lay prostrate on the surface of the soil. The adult P. hysterophorus is upright, with aforementioned deep tap root system. The stems become more woody and rigid as the plant evolves into a format more resembling a bush. P. hysterophorus reproduces through seeds, so how the seeds are distributed and when is very important. The dispersal of seeds can be mediated by several methods. These include: water currents, stock feed, animals, and occasionally the wind. When it comes to long distance distribution, which contributes heavily to its invasive abilities, is usually facilitated by moving vehicles, farm machinery and flooding.

=== Allelopathy ===
Chemical structure of parthenin, a major toxic chemical found in Parthenium hysterophorus

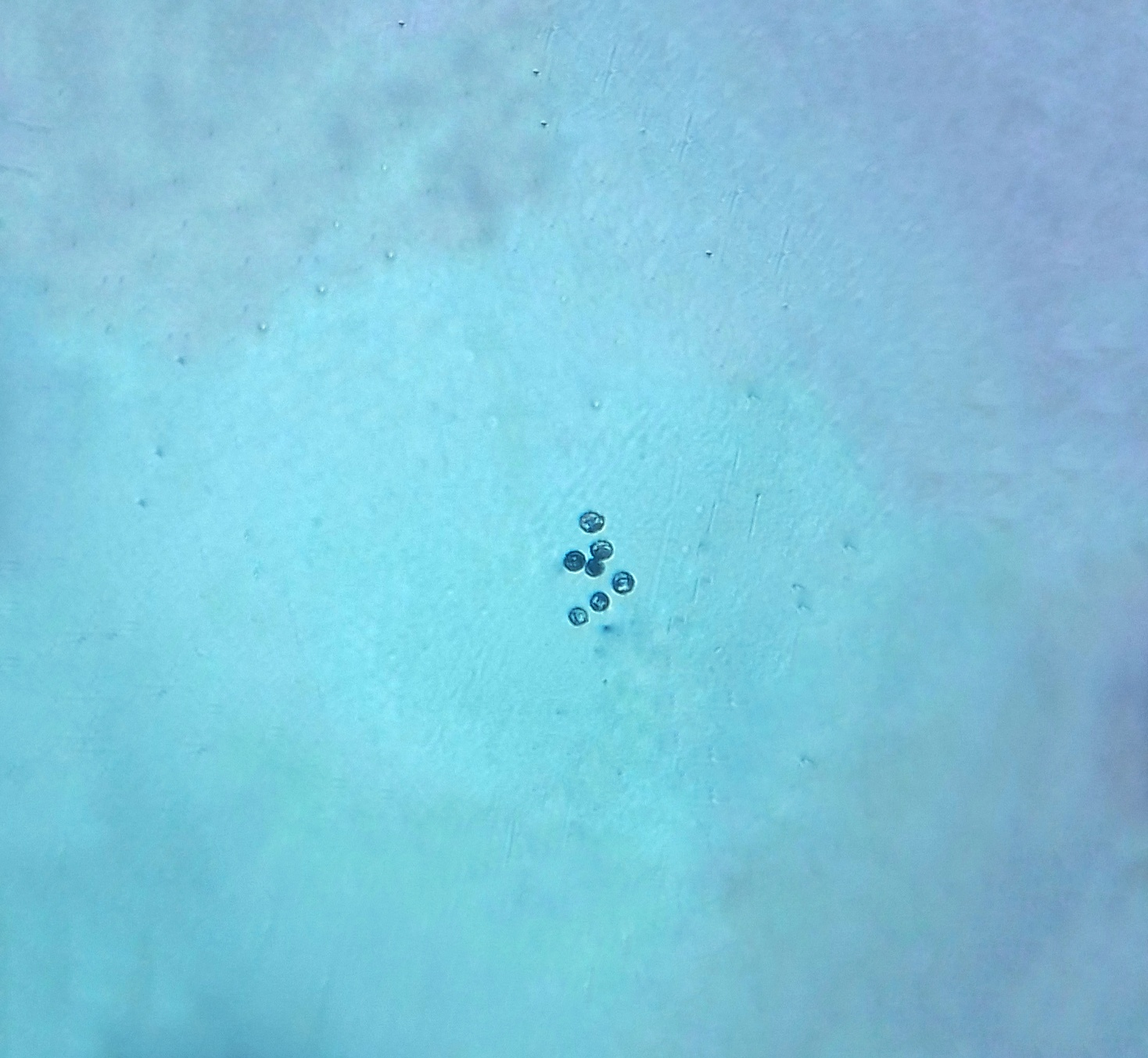
Pollen grains of Parthenium hysterophorus

P. hysterophorus is an allelopathic plant. Such plants produce growth-inhibiting chemicals that can positively or negatively affect the growth of other plants around them. Invasive species tend to have a negative allelopathic effect, causing the arrest of growth for the native plants. Pasture growth, fruit setting in crops, and forage production are all negatively affected by the allelopathic chemicals that the weed releases. Such allelopathic chemicals for P. hysterophorus include many phenolic acid derivatives and a sesquiterpene lactone called parthenin. While parthenin is amongst many chemicals released by P. hysterophorus to be pinned as the most responsible for plant growth inhibition, it is also a severe irritant and allergen. Exposure to the parthenin in the plant can cause contact dermatitis in both plants and animals. The Parthenium pollen grains frequently trigger pollen allergies. If ingested, it can cause respiratory illness side effects such as hay fever, asthma, burning and blisters, breathlessness, choking, and allergic rhinitis in humans. For animals, side effects can include alopecia, pruritus, diarrhea, and anorexia. It can also be responsible for bitter milk disease in livestock when their fodder is contaminated with Parthenium leaves. Among other allelopathic effects of the species, the presence of grains inhibits fruit set in tomato, brinjal, beans, and a number of other crop plants.

== Invasive species ==
Parthenium hysterophorus has been coined as one of the worst, and most successful invasive species on several continents. P. hysterophorus invades disturbed land, including roadsides. It infests pastures and farmland, causing often disastrous loss of yield, as reflected in common names such as famine weed. In some areas, heavy outbreaks have been ubiquitous, affecting livestock and crop production, and human health.

Parthenium hysterophorus originally inhabited terrains around Mexico, Central and South America. It was first identified on the Island of Jamaica in 1753. Habitats in that area can range from the tropics to the deserts. However, after becoming an invasive species, this weed thrives most on land that is disturbed and arable. Ever since the weed made its way out of its original habitat in the Americas, it has effectively invaded around 43 countries. This includes orchards, agricultural areas, wastelands, urban areas and more. They can also be found along the side of roads and railroad tracks. There are 8 major and 11 minor invasive introductions of P. hysterophorus to non-native territories. Contaminated grain, pasture, and seed lots are the primary culprits for the highly successful spread of the weed. It is also said that specifically the introduction through contaminated cereal from North America was a contributor to the invasion in Israel. The major introductions were in India and Ethiopia. The primary modes of dispersion are through roads, vehicles, wind, and water. Aside from being adept breeders, P. hysterophorus seeds are also resistant to stressful environments. They can withstand drought, high salt concentrations, and alkaline clay soils that would be lethal to most plants. Due to its allelopathic abilities, P. hysterophorus can pose as a danger to other plants, animals, and humans in the area it is invading. The species has been listed as an invasive alien species of Union Concern. This means it is illegal to import or sell this species in the whole of the European Union.

== Ecology ==
Depending on the habitat and the qualities of the organism, an invasive species can be detrimental and/or beneficial. While the plant is most known for its threat to ecosystems on multiple different continents, Parthenium hysterophorus has been found to have many attributes that could possibly benefit the ecosystems that it is technically non-native to.

=== Threats ===
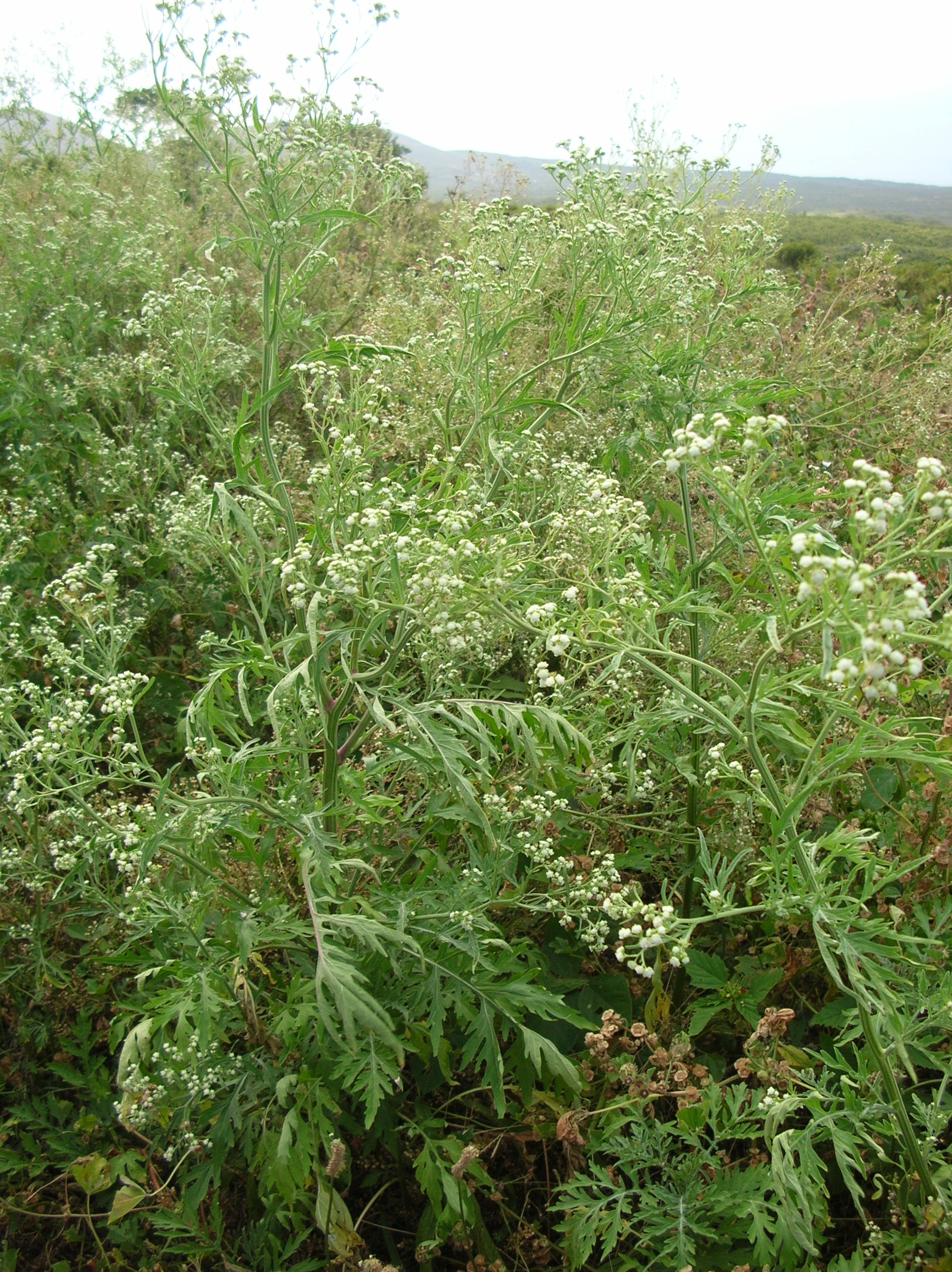
Parthenium hysterophorus on open land in Hawaii

Parthenium hysterophorus survives primarily through habitat degradation. It produces allelopathic chemicals that inhibit the growth of other plants, and are extremely competitive. They compete with local crops, pasture plants and other indigenous foliage for nitrogenous soil components. Due to the weed being able to withstand a number of harsh environments and conditions, they rapidly take over most habitats that they invade and are difficult to remove once settled. High fecundity and seed dispersal methods also contribute to the plant's persistence. The success of P. hysterophorus as an invasive species has drastic effects on agriculture, human health, biodiversity and habitat conservation. A study based out of South Korea published in 2023 discovered that P. hysterophorus thrives in habitats heavily affected by climate change, predicting the northbound expansion and habitat sustainability of the plant by 2081-2100.

The socioeconomic implications are of equal concern to scientists. In South Africa, Parthenium hysterophorus is known locally as famine weed for its extremely destructive nature against agriculture and farming. P. hysterophorus was first recorded in the South African province, KwaZulu-Natal in 1880, but didn't become a true problem until the 1980s. P. hysterophorus slowly degrades the habitat over time by limiting the amount of healthy forage, so livestock productivity is jeopardized. This simultaneously damages the lives of the South African people who rely on agriculture and livestock, but also the environment as a whole. It is also a highly toxic allergen. It can cause respiratory and surface allergic reactions in humans and animals. The systematic ingestion of the weed by livestock poses a threat to food safety and security. A study published in 2021 showed that the plant could accelerate the spread of malaria in Eastern Africa by supplying food and shelter to mosquitoes. This could classify the weed as a public health threat.

=== Benefits ===
The allelopathic chemicals that are released by Parthenium hysterophorus are most known for their harmful effects on plants and the ecosystem. Research shows that the same allelopathic properties can be advantageous to the ecosystem in various ways. P. hysterophorus is essentially a natural herbicide. According to the United States Environmental Protection Agency, a herbicide is a chemical or substance that is used to control undesirable vegetation. Despite synthetic chemical herbicides being the go-to for killing weeds, they are toxic to the environment. They are also a threat to human and livestock health. Researchers have been searching for nature-derived alternatives to synthetic herbicides for decades. However, trying to lessen use of synthetic herbicides while still maintaining and increasing crop production poses a challenge. Several studies have shown that concentrated methanol extracts of the stem, leaf, and flower of P. hysterophorus have allelopathic effects on weed, density, seed germination and biomass. Herbicides made some natural resources like P. hysterophorus both more cost-effective and environmentally friendly. The weed is also reported to have pesticidal, insecticidal, nematocidal potential. Additionally, Parthenium hysterophorus is also being looked at as a potential energy source due to P. hysterophorus being a lignocellulosic biomass and a possible source of ethanol. Parthenium hysterophorus is also being investigated as a possible means of removing heavy metals and dyes from the environment, control of aquatic weeds, commercial enzyme production, an additive in manure for biogas production, as a biopesticide and as green manure and compost.

== Conservation and control ==
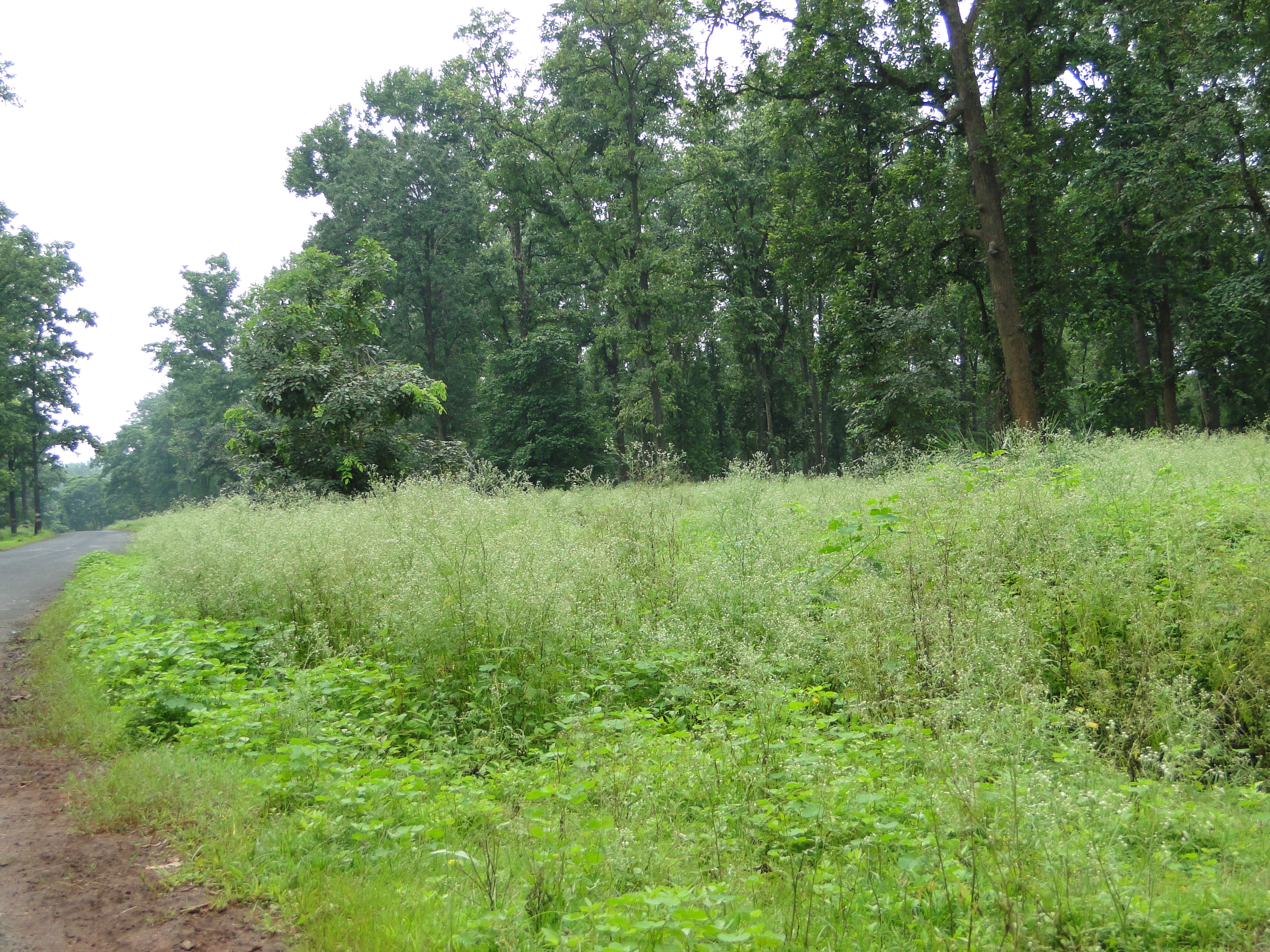
Parthenium in Achanakmar Wildlife Sanctuary

According to the National Environmental Management Biodiversity Act (NEMBA), P. hysterophorus is classified as a Category 1b alien invader in South Africa. Species in this category are thought to have no economic purpose and considered to be an extreme threat. However, especially in South Africa, not much research has been brought to discuss the possible benefits of the weed. In order to conserve the native biodiversity of the habitats invaded with Parthenium hysterophorus, whilst ensuring it isn't forced into extinction, conservation biologists have been investigating methods of control that consider both the favorable and unfavorable attributes of the weed.

=== Chemical Control ===
Chemical control is also a key method for managing Parthenium hysterophorus, especially in heavily infested areas. Herbicides such as glyphosate, 2,4-D, metsulfuron-methyl, atrazine, and diuron have shown effectiveness in suppressing its growth when applied at early stages like the rosette phase. Research also highlights the importance of timing and repeated applications for successful control. However, excessive reliance on chemical herbicides can lead to environmental risks and herbicide resistance, suggesting that chemical control should be integrated with other management strategies.

=== Physical control ===
Physical control of Parthenium hysterophorus involves manual or mechanical removal to directly reduce plant populations. Light infestations of Parthenium hysterophorus in cultivated fields may be hoed or weeded by hand if labor is available at acceptable cost, but the weed proliferates so quickly that larger measures are often implemented. Removing the weed by hand involves direct skin contact, which can cause allergic reactions like contact dermatitis. Mechanical methods like mowing or slashing can also limit spread, though repeated efforts are necessary to deplete the persistent soil seed bank and prevent regrowth. While physical control is labor-intensive and less practical for large-scale infestations, it remains a valuable tool when used in combination with chemical and cultural strategies.

=== Cultural control ===
Cultural control methods aim to suppress Parthenium hysterophorus by promoting the growth of competitive, desirable plant species. Techniques such as crop rotation, intercropping, and maintaining dense pasturelands help prevent the weed from establishing. Planting fast-growing grasses like Cenchrus ciliaris has been particularly effective in reducing its spread. Cultural practices not only limit P. hysterophorus populations but also enhance soil health and biodiversity, making them a sustainable option when combined with other control methods.

=== Biological control ===
The most satisfactory and promising means of practical long-term control are biological. In various countries, such as Australia and South Africa, several other biocontrol agents have been released or are under evaluation. Various species that feed on the weed are in use or on trial in various countries. The best-established control organism so far is a beetle native to Mexico, Calligrapha bicolorata (Mexican beetle), which was first introduced to India in 1984. It since has become widespread and well-established on the subcontinent. It defoliates and often kills the weed, and its damage to the young flowering tops reduces seed production. Two more species of beetles that have been released in South Africa, a stem boring weevil Listronotus setosipennis, and a seed weevil Smicronyx lutulentus. In Australia, the two species with the greatest effect seem to be the beetle Calligrapha bicolorata and a stem-galling moth Epiblema strenuana. However, other species that appear to have established usefully include a leaf-mining moth, Bucculatrix parthenica; a stem-galling weevil, Conotrachelus albocinereus; and a root-boring moth Carmenta ithacae.
