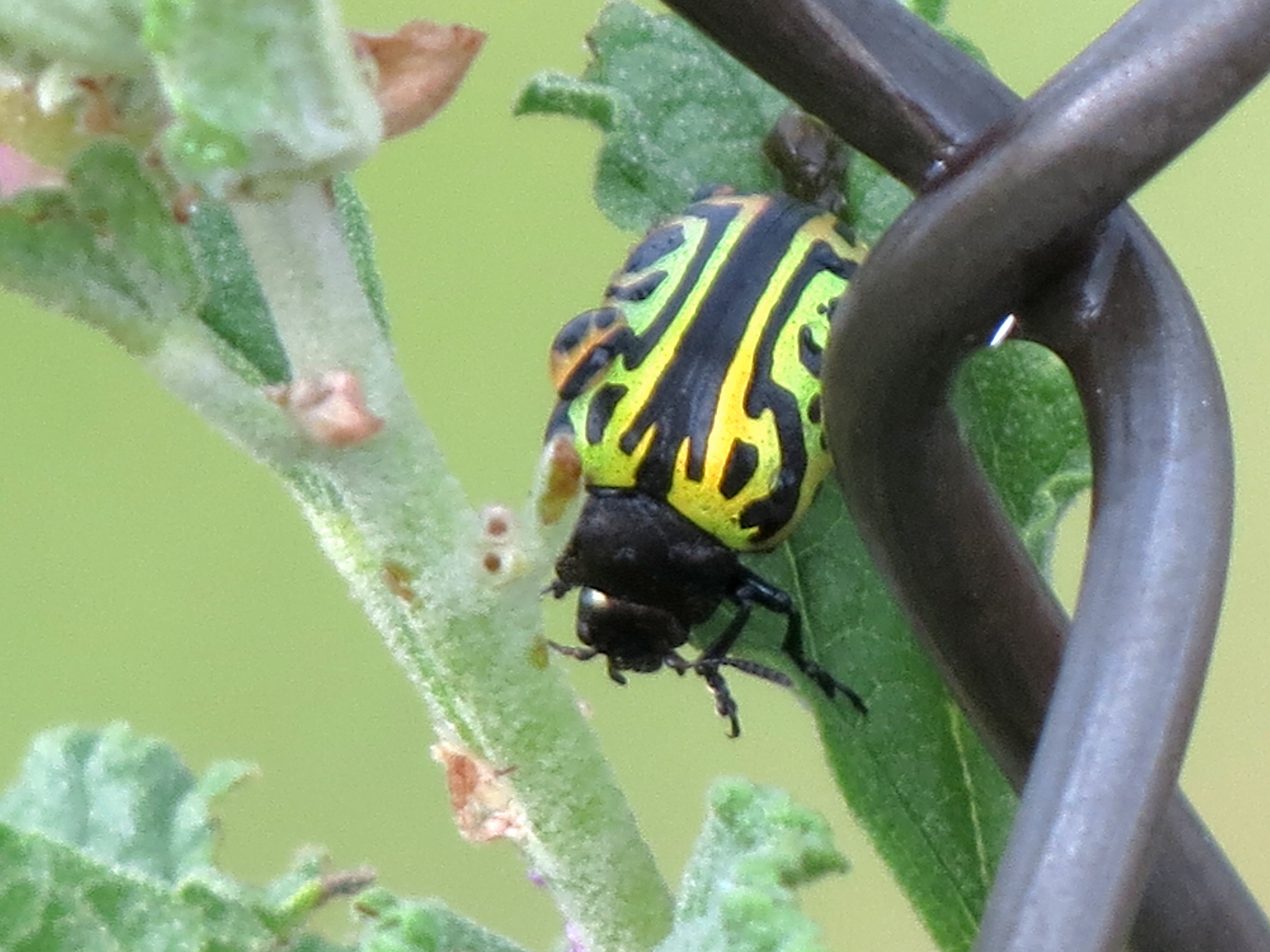

Scientific classification
- Kingdom: Animalia
- Phylum: Arthropoda
- Clade: Pancrustacea
- Class: Insecta
- Order: Coleoptera
- Suborder: Polyphaga
- Infraorder: Cucujiformia
- Family: Chrysomelidae
- Genus: Calligrapha
- Species: C. serpentina

Binomial name
- Calligrapha serpentina (Rogers, 1856)

= Calligrapha serpentina =

Species of beetle

Calligrapha serpentina, the globemallow leaf beetle, is a species of leaf beetle in the family Chrysomelidae. It is found in Mexico and the United States.

In 2021, several important taxonomic changes were made: the species Calligrapha mexicana was revalidated, reversing a long-held synonymy with C. serpentina, and the variety Calligrapha serpetina var. discrepans was upgraded in status to species as Calligrapha discrepans.
