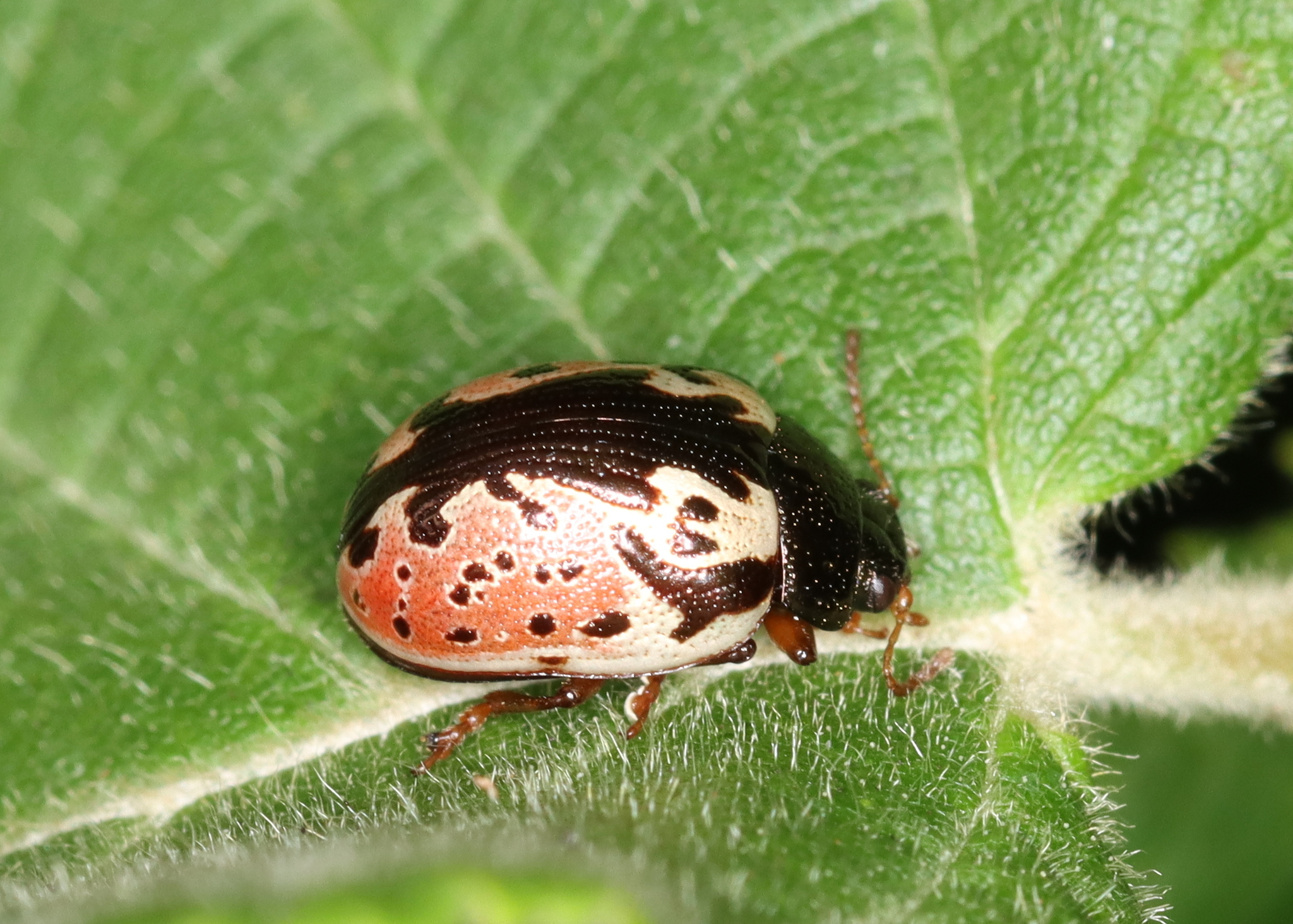
- Calligrapha rhoda, Massachusetts

Scientific classification
- Kingdom: Animalia
- Phylum: Arthropoda
- Clade: Pancrustacea
- Class: Insecta
- Order: Coleoptera
- Suborder: Polyphaga
- Infraorder: Cucujiformia
- Family: Chrysomelidae
- Genus: Calligrapha
- Species: C. rhoda

Binomial name
- Calligrapha rhoda Knab, 1909

= Calligrapha rhoda =

Species of beetle

Calligrapha rhoda is a species of leaf beetle in the family Chrysomelidae. It is found in North America.
