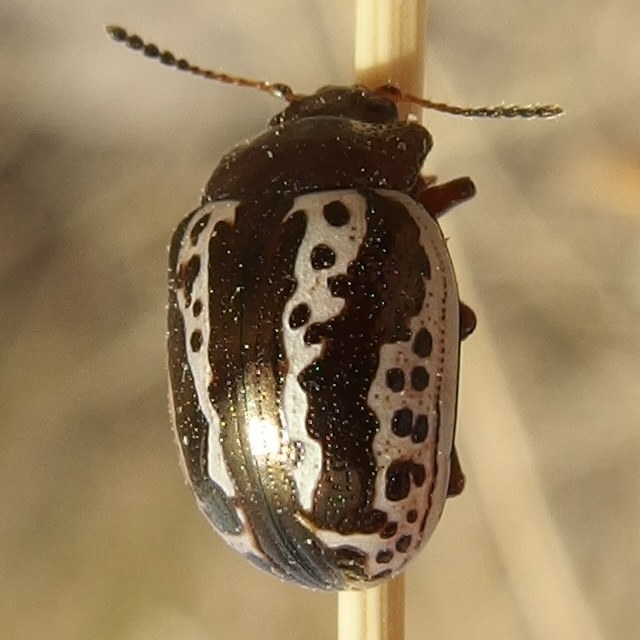
- Calligrapha arizonica, Arizona

Scientific classification
- Kingdom: Animalia
- Phylum: Arthropoda
- Clade: Pancrustacea
- Class: Insecta
- Order: Coleoptera
- Suborder: Polyphaga
- Infraorder: Cucujiformia
- Family: Chrysomelidae
- Subfamily: Chrysomelinae
- Tribe: Chrysomelini
- Genus: Calligrapha
- Species: C. arizonica

Binomial name
- Calligrapha arizonica Schaeffer, 1906

= Calligrapha arizonica =

Species of beetle

Calligrapha arizonica is a species of leaf beetle belonging to the family Chrysomelidae, in the subgenus Zygogramma, which was formerly a genus.

== Description ==
C. arizonica is a small leaf beetle with a brown pronotum and yellow elytra marked with elongated brown stripes and spots.

== Distribution and habitat ==
C. arizonica is native to North America.

Adult beetles are associated generally with plants of the family Asteraceae), with a tentative relationship with the American trixis (Trixis californica).
