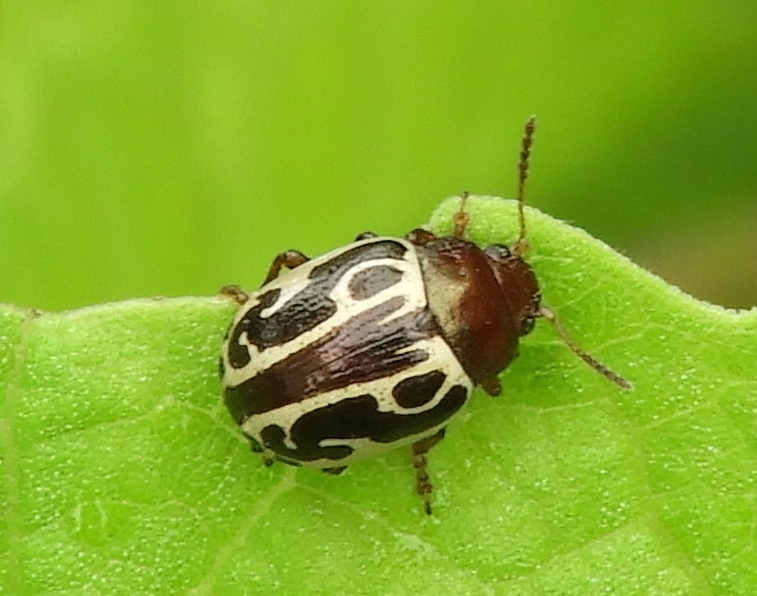

Scientific classification
- Kingdom: Animalia
- Phylum: Arthropoda
- Clade: Pancrustacea
- Class: Insecta
- Order: Coleoptera
- Suborder: Polyphaga
- Infraorder: Cucujiformia
- Family: Chrysomelidae
- Genus: Calligrapha
- Species: C. piceicollis

Binomial name
- Calligrapha piceicollis (Stål, 1859)

= Calligrapha piceicollis =

Species of beetle

Calligrapha piceicollis is a species of leaf beetle belonging to the family Chrysomelidae, in the subgenus Zygogramma, which was formerly a genus. It is found in Central America, North America, and Europe.
