= Calligrapha praecelsis =

Scientific classification
- Kingdom: Animalia
- Phylum: Arthropoda
- Clade: Pancrustacea
- Class: Insecta
- Order: Coleoptera
- Suborder: Polyphaga
- Infraorder: Cucujiformia
- Family: Chrysomelidae
- Genus: Calligrapha
- Species: C. praecelsis

Binomial name
- Calligrapha praecelsis (Rogers, 1856)

Species of beetle

Calligrapha praecelsis is a species in the family Chrysomelidae ("leaf beetles"), in the order Coleoptera ("beetles"). It is found in North America.
