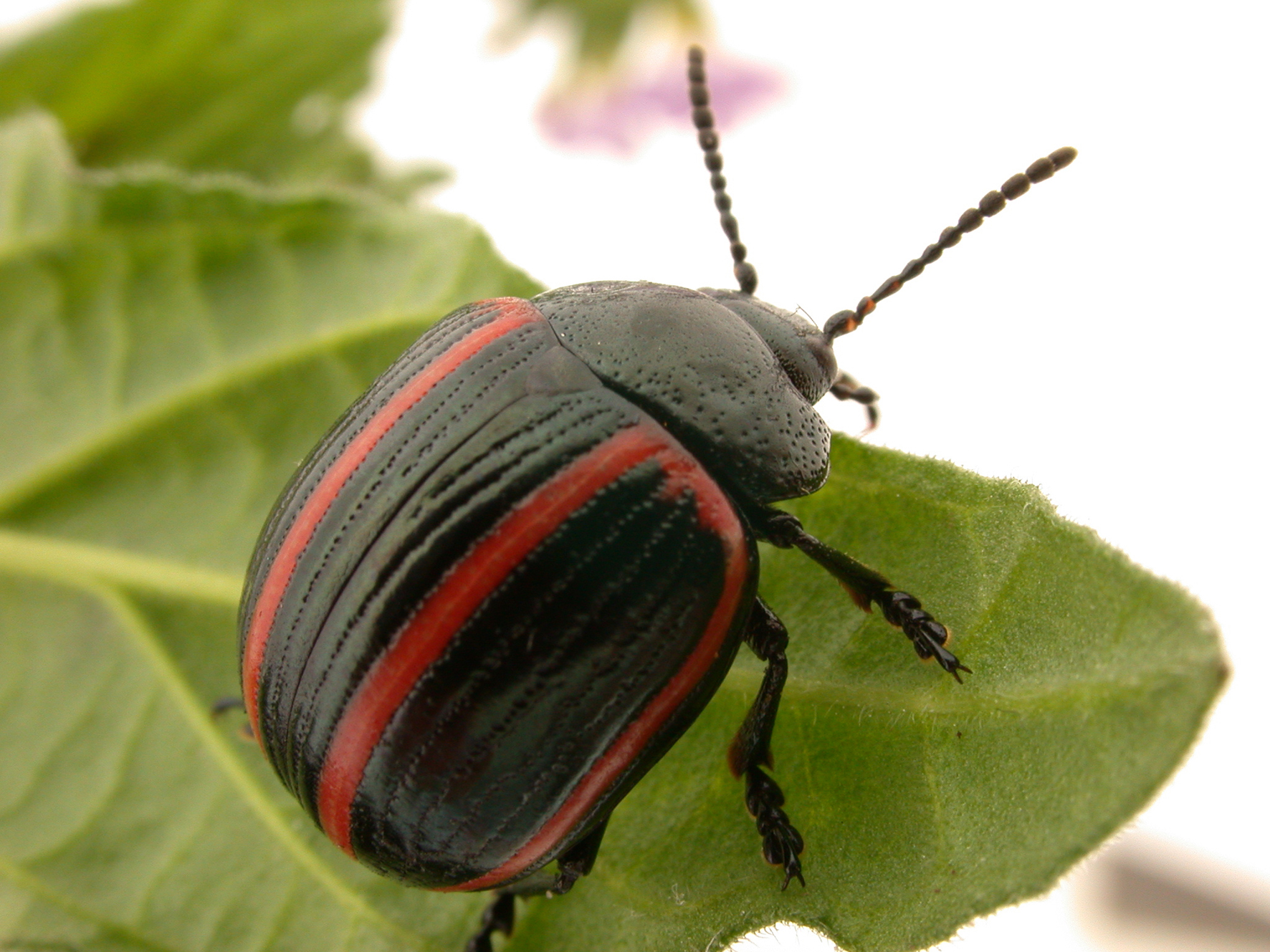
- Deuterocampta quadrijuga adult

Scientific classification
- Kingdom: Animalia
- Phylum: Arthropoda
- Clade: Pancrustacea
- Class: Insecta
- Order: Coleoptera
- Suborder: Polyphaga
- Infraorder: Cucujiformia
- Family: Chrysomelidae
- Subfamily: Chrysomelinae
- Tribe: Chrysomelini; Latreille, 1802

Subtribes
- Chrysolinina; Chrysomelina; Doryphorina; Entomoscelina; Gonioctenina; (but see text)

= Chrysomelini =

Tribe of beetles

Chrysomelini is a tribe in the leaf beetle subfamily Chrysomelinae. There are over 150 described genera in Chrysomelini, variously arranged into subtribes, though the exact number and delimitation of these subtribes is a source of ongoing debate.

This tribe unites the "typical" leaf beetles – small to mid-sized beetles, usually with a rather rotund shape. Many Chrysomelini are among the most colorful beetles known, some rivaling jewel beetles with their shiny metallic iridescence. Other species are not metallic, but colored contrastingly; in some cases this is known or suspected to be aposematic coloration to warn insectivores that these beetles accumulate noxious chemicals from their foodplants. Some – perhaps most notoriously the invasive Colorado potato beetle (Leptinotarsa decemlineata) – are dangerous crop pests, while others are useful in biocontrol of invasive weeds.

== Genera ==
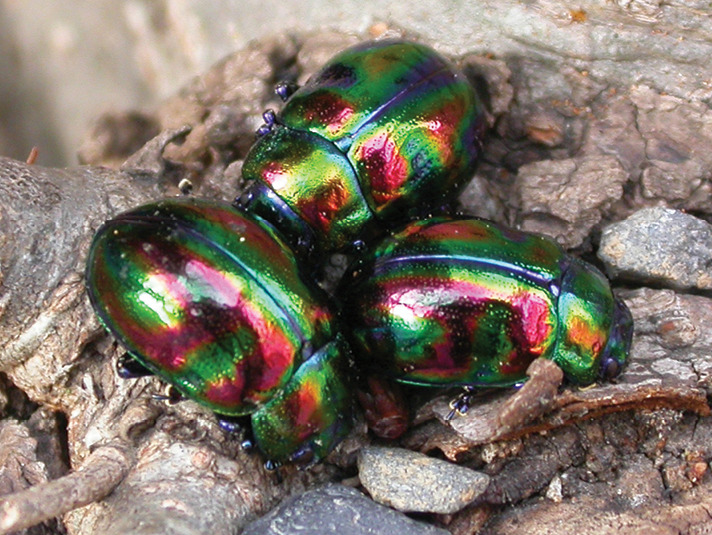
Ambrostoma koreana adults in winter quarters

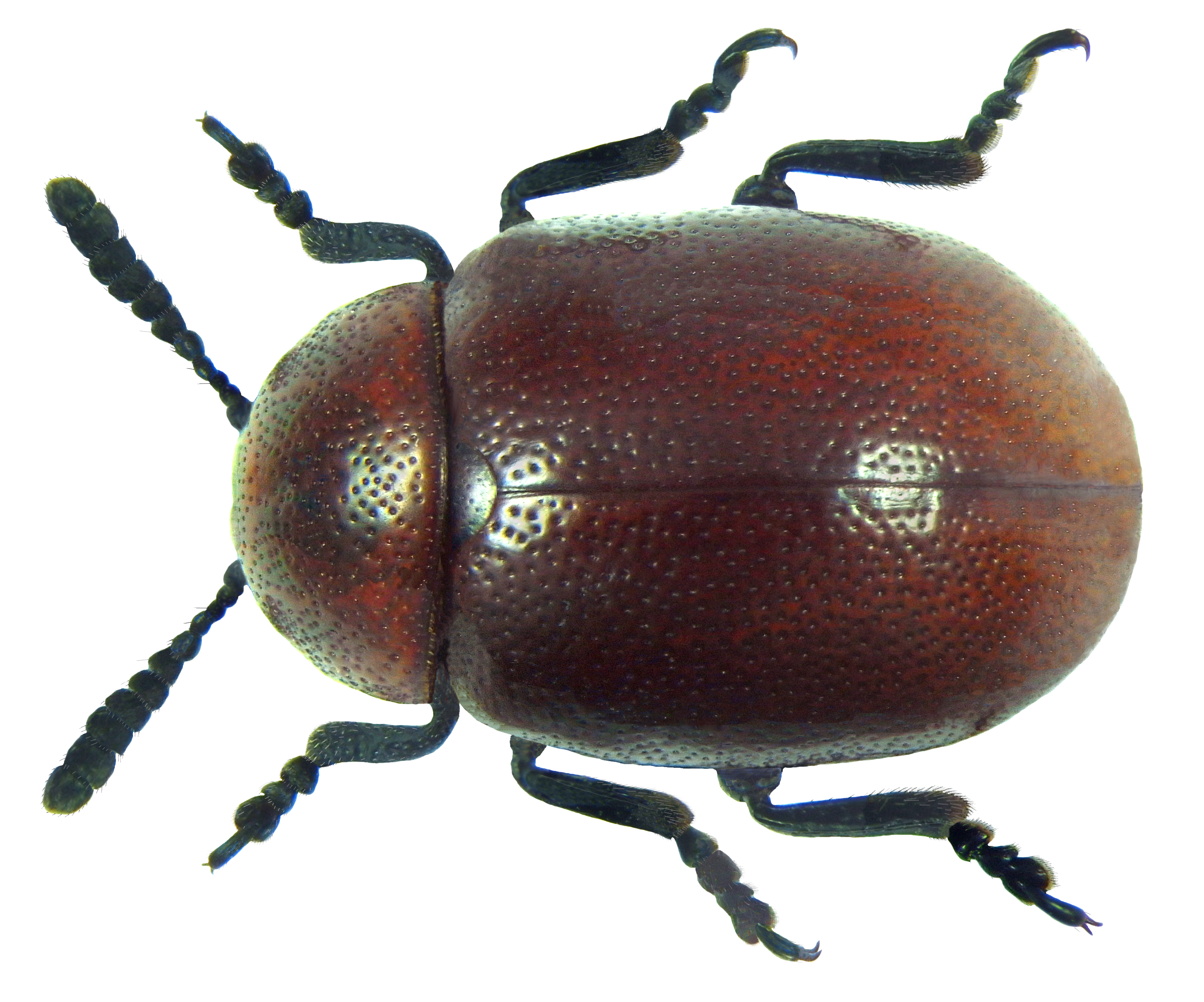
Ceralces affinis from Diani Beach, Kenya

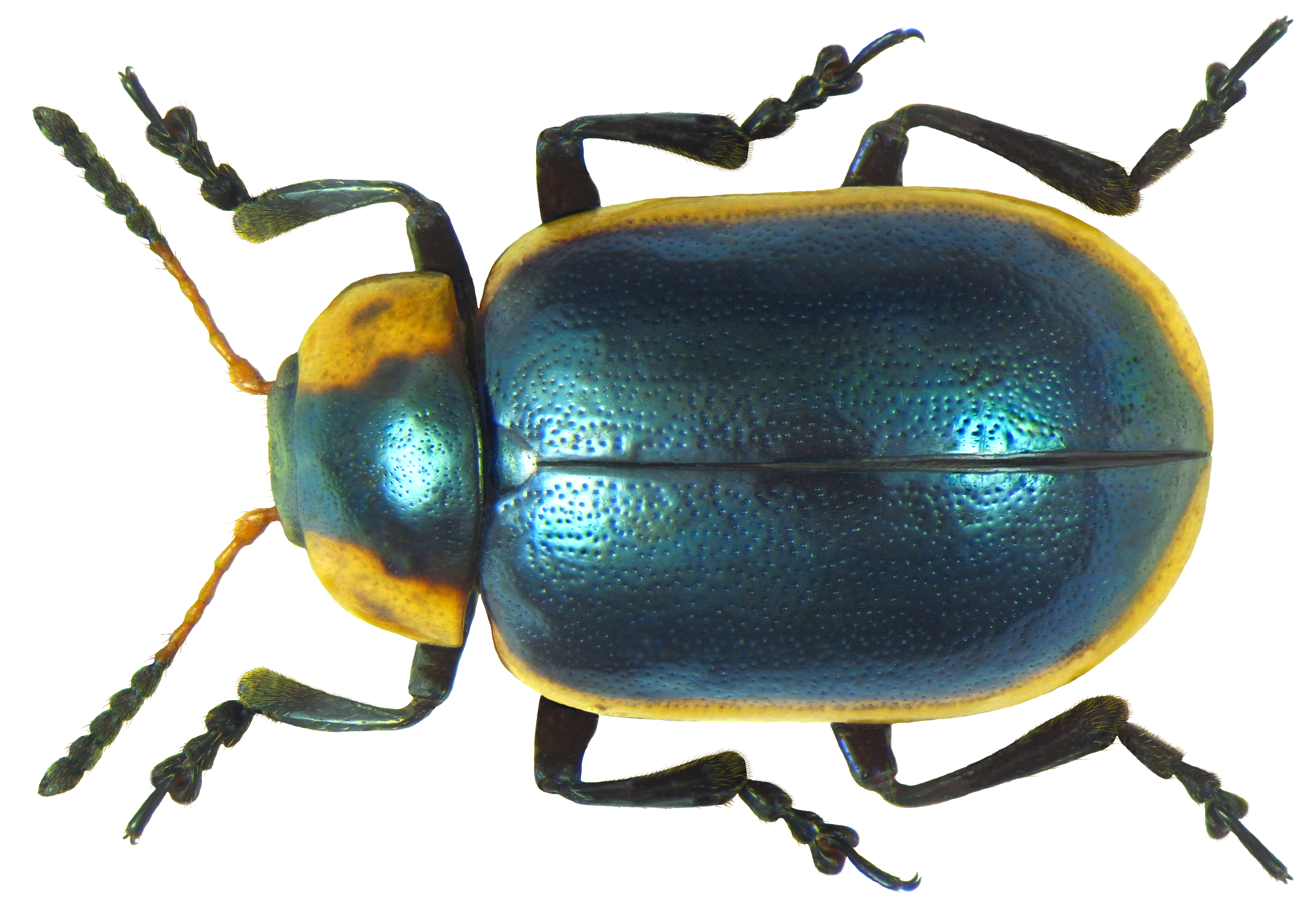
Mesoplatys cincta from Cape Skirring, Senegal

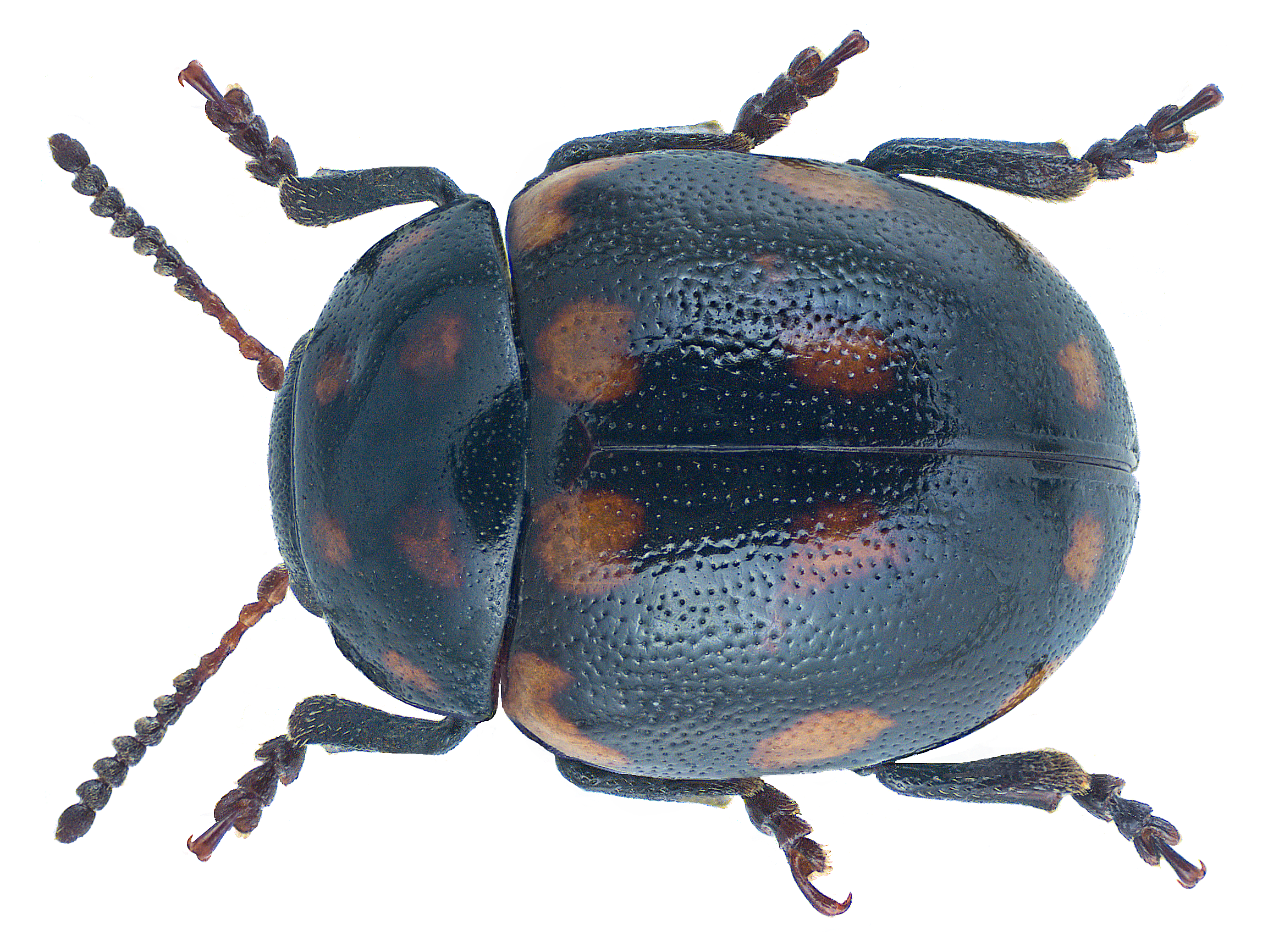
Oidosoma ornatum from Diani Beach, Kenya

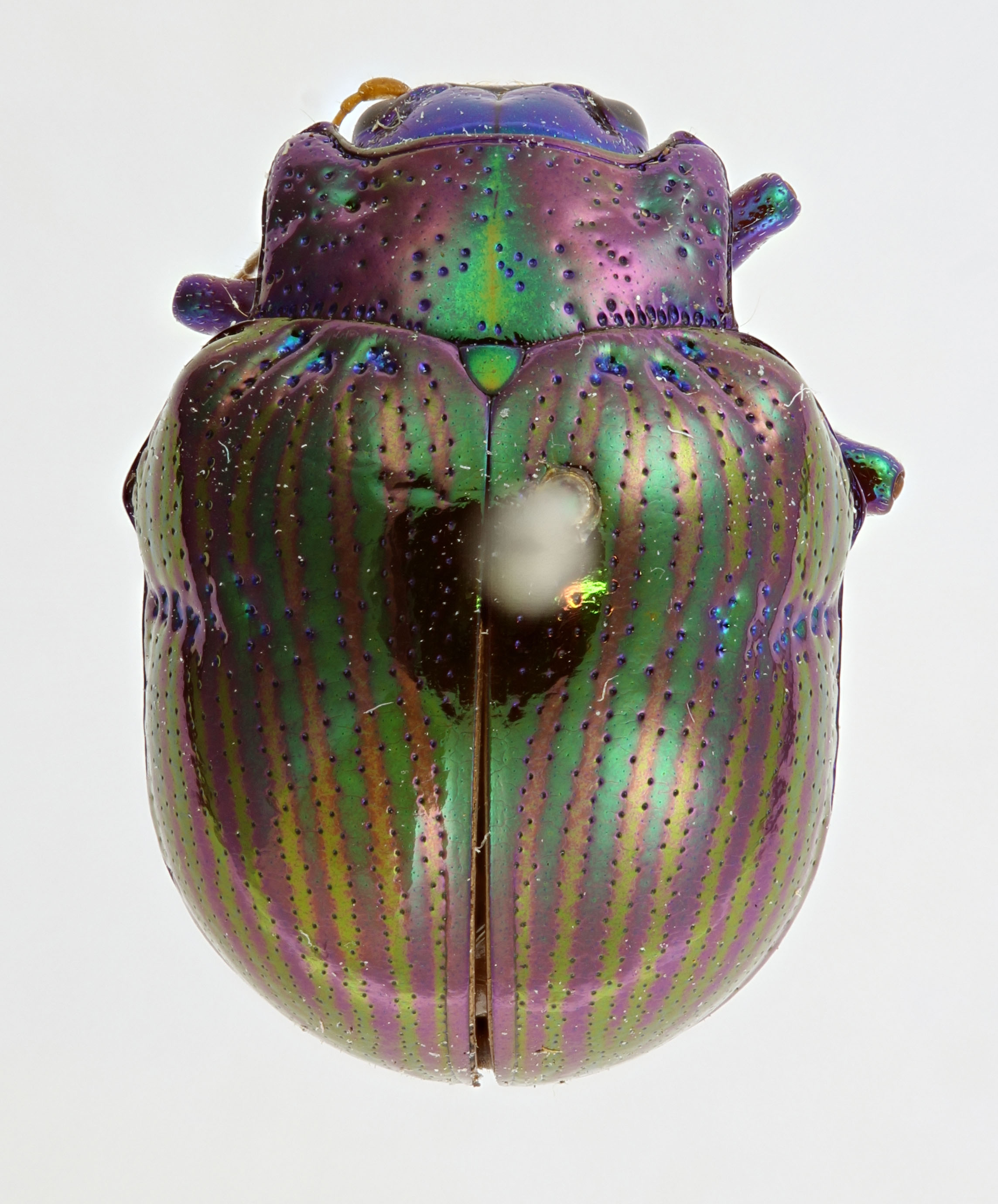
Pterodunga mirabilis from Garradunga, Australia

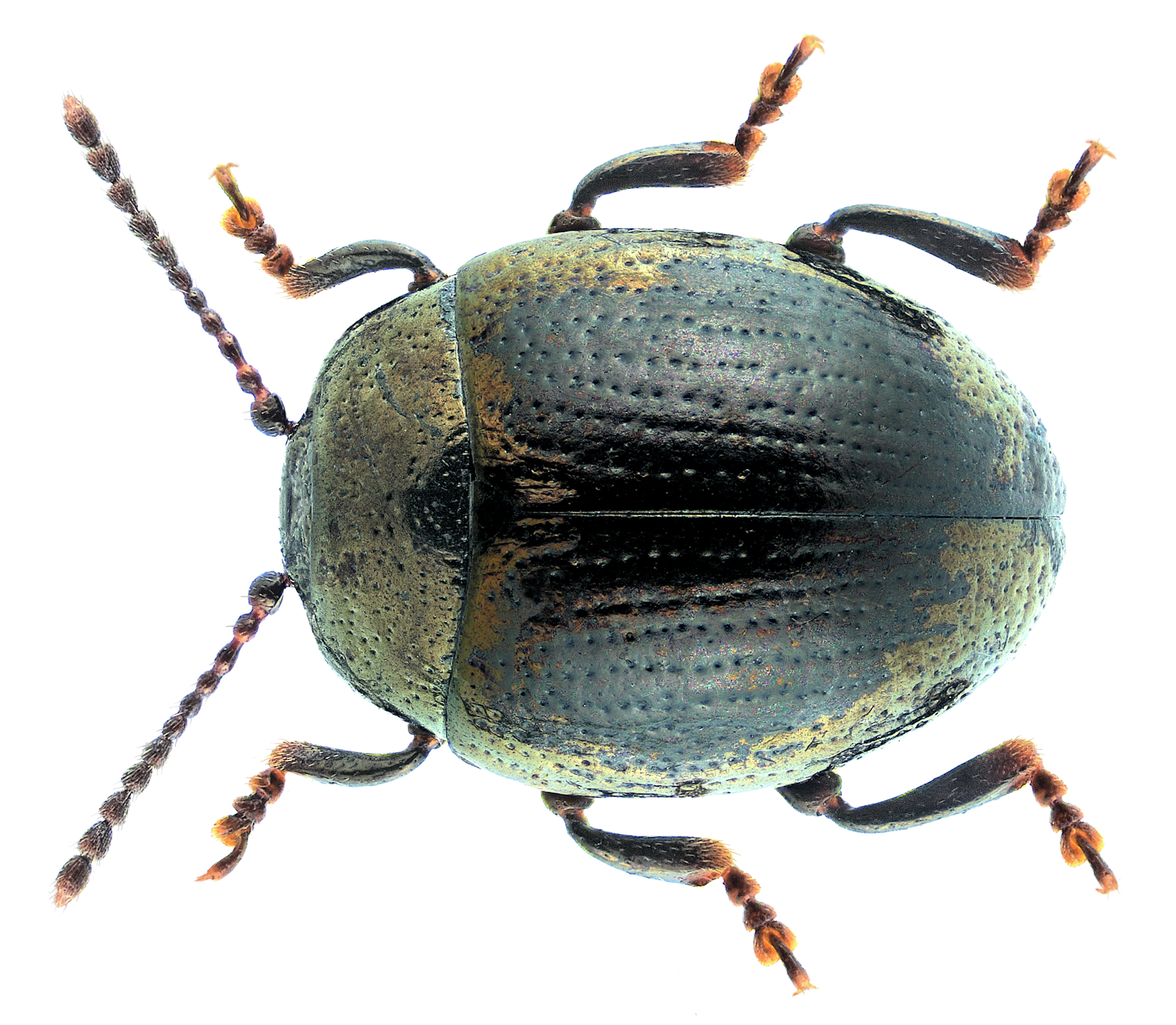
Sclerophaedon orbicularis from Bad Berneck im Fichtelgebirge, Germany

- Aeneolucentia
- Aesernoides
- Agasta
- Ageniosa
- Agrosteella
- Agrosteomela
- Alfius
- Algoala
- Ambrostoma Motschulsky, 1860
- Antongilitis
- Aphilon Sharp, 1876
- Apterocuris
- Araucanomela
- Asiparopsis
- Ateratocerus Blackburn, 1890
- Barymela
- Barymelina
- Basilewskyanella
- Blaptea
- Caccomolpus Sharp, 1886
- Cadiz
- Callidemum
- Calligrapha (including Bidensomela, Zygogramma)
- Calomela
- Camerounia
- Canobolas
- Centroscelis
- Ceralces
- Chalcolampra (= Allocharis, Cyrtonogetus, Eualema)
- Chalcomela (= Cyclomela, Micromela)
- Chilenomela
- Chrysolina
- Chrysomela
- Colaphellus (= Colaphus L.Redtenbacher, 1845 (non Dejean, 1836))
- Colaphinus
- Colaspidema (= Colaphus Dejean, 1836)
- Cosmogramma
- Crosita
- Cryptostetha
- Cuprasoroides
- Cyclonoda Baly, 1878
- Cyrtonastes
- Cyrtonus (= Cyrlonussa)
- Cystocnemis Motschulsky, 1860
- Desmogramma
- Desmogrammella
- Deuterocampta
- Diacosma Weise, 1923
- Dicranosterna
- Dinahia Bechyně, 1946
- Doryphora
- Dorysterna
- Elytroatra
- Elytrosphaera
- Entomoscelis
- Ethomela Lea, 1916
- Eugastromela Lea, 1929
- Eugonycha
- Eulina Baly, 1855
- Euparochia Motschulsky, 1860 (= "Euparocha" (nomen nudum))
- Euryceraea
- Eustilodes
- Ewanius Reid, 2002
- Faex Weise, 1901
- Falsocolaphellus
- Fasta
- Gasterantrodes
- Gastrolina
- Gastrolinoides Chûjô & Kimoto, 1960
- Gastrophysa (= Gastroidea)
- Gavirga
- Geomela
- Gibbiomela Daccordi, 2003
- Gonioctena
- Grammicomela Lea, 1916
- Grammodesma
- Grammomades
- Henicotherus Brèthes, 1929
- Hispostoma
- Humba (= Eumela, Eumelaella)
- Hydrothassa (sometimes in Prasocuris)
- Hysmatodon Reid, 2002
- Iscadida
- Isostilodes
- Jermaniella
- Johannica Blackburn, 1888
- Jolivetia
- Labidomera
- Lamprolina
- Leioplacis Chevrolat, 1843 (= Lioplacis)
- Leptinotarsa
- Leucocera
- Limenta
- Linographa
- Lycaria
- Machomena
- Maurodus Leschen, Reid & Nadein, 2020
- Mesoplatys
- Metastyla
- Microtheca
- Monocampta
- Nanomela Leschen, Reid & Nadein, 2020
- Neophaedon
- Novacastria Selman in Selman & Lowman, 1983
- Odontoedon Ge & Daccordi in Ge et al., 2013
- Oidosoma
- Oomela Lea, 1916
- Oreina (= Orina)
- Oreomela
- Oreothassa
- Palaeomela Daccordi, 1996
- Pandona
- Palimbola
- Parambrostoma Chen, 1936
- Parastilodes
- Paropsides
- Paropsimorpha Lhoste, 1934
- Paropsis (= Parona, Procris Weise, 1901 (non Latreille, 1807: preoccupied), Procrisina)
- Paropsisterna (= Chrysophtharta, Niliosoma, Sterromela, Xanthogramma Weise, 1923 (non Schiner, 1860: preoccupied))
- Pataya
- Peltoschema
- Periscapta
- Phaedon
- Phaedonia
- Philhydronopa Weise, 1901
- Phola (= Phyllophila Stål, 1857 (non Guenée, 1852: preoccupied))
- Phratora (= Phyllodecta)
- Phyllocharis (= Phyllocharoides)
- Pixis
- Plagiodera (= Pseudoparopsis)
- Plagiomada
- Plagiosterna
- Planagetes
- Platymela Baly, 1856
- Platyphora
- Podostilodes
- Poropteromela Lea, 1916
- Potaninia Weise, 1889
- Prasocuris
- Promechus (= Aesernia)
- Proseicela
- Pterodunga Daccordi, 2000
- Pubistilodes
- Rhaebosterna
- Rudebeckiana
- Sclerophaedon
- Sphaeratrix
- Sphaerolina
- Sphaerotritoma Arrow, 1943
- Sternoplatys Motschulsky, 1860
- Stilodes Chevrolat, 1836 (formerly in Leptinotarsa)
- Strichosa
- Strumatophyma
- Suinzona Chen, 1931
- Taipinus Lopatin, 2007
- Timarchida
- Timarchomima
- Timarchosoma
- Tinosis Weise, 1908
- Trachymela (= Chondromela)
- Trichomela
- Tritaenia
- Trochalonota
- Xenomela
- Yunnaedon
- Zeaphilon Leschen, Reid & Nadein, 2020
- Zira Reid & Smith, 2004

In addition, a prehistoric genus Stenaspidiotus has been described from Dominican amber fossils of at least early Miocene age (15-20 mya).
