= Phola (beetle) =

Scientific classification
- Kingdom: Animalia
- Phylum: Arthropoda
- Class: Insecta
- Order: Coleoptera
- Suborder: Polyphaga
- Infraorder: Cucujiformia
- Family: Chrysomelidae
- Subfamily: Chrysomelinae
- Genus: Phola; Weise, 1890

Type species
- Phola keyserlingi (= Chrysomela octodecimguttata Fabricius, 1775) Weise, 1890

Species
- See text

Synonyms
- Phyllophila Stål, 1857 (nec Guenée, 1852)

Genus of leaf beetles

Phola is a genus of leaf beetles in the family Chrysomelidae, subfamily Chrysomelinae. It occurs in east and south-east Asia, the south-west Pacific, eastern and northern Australia. It was formerly a synonym of Chalcolampra. It is distinguished from other chrysomeline genera in Australia by the twisted epipleura, but its recognition may render either Chalcolampra or Phyllocharis paraphyletic.

== List of species ==
After Lee and Geiser (2023)'s revision of Phola, the genus contains two species:

- Phola decempustulata (Baly, 1864) – Indonesia (Bacan Island, Sulawesi), Malaysia, Thailand
- Phola octodecimguttata (Fabricius, 1775) – Japan, China, Taiwan, Thailand, Laos, Vietnam, Myanmar, South India, Sri Lanka, Malaysia, Singapore, Brunei, Indonesia, Papua New Guinea, Solomon Island, Australia

The Australian Faunal Directory lists five additional species for the genus from Australia, though Lee and Geiser were not able to find a published source formally transferring them to the genus nor confirm if the species belong to it in their revision.

- Phola decemmaculata (Lea, 1903)
- Phola delicatula (Lea, 1916)
- Phola quadrifasciata (Lea, 1916)
- Phola tenuis (Lea, 1916)
- Phola vitticollis (Lea, 1915)

== Biology ==
Phola octodecimguttata is presumed to be a univoltine species, producing one generation per spring. Female adults lay more than 30 eggs on young leaves of Vitex rotundifolia, and larvae hatch from the eggs in four to five days. The larvae feed on the leaves of the plant, and produce a tube of faeces fixed to a leaf or branch as a shelter to conceal their whole bodies. The larvae become mature in 12 to 14 days, after which they burrow into the soil and build underground chambers in order to become a pupa. The pupa stage lasts seven to eight days. Larvae and adults of this species have also been observed feeding on leaves of Vitex negundo in southern Taiwan, but the larvae did not build tubes of faeces and were exposed.

The biology of P. decempustulata is unknown.
