= Alfius =

Alfius may refer to various members of the Roman gens Alfia. It may also refer to:

- Alfius (beetle), a genus of leaf beetles in the subfamily Chrysomelinae
- Nicolaas Alfius, a member of the Indonesia national rugby union team
