= Trochalonota =

Scientific classification
- Kingdom: Animalia
- Phylum: Arthropoda
- Clade: Pancrustacea
- Class: Insecta
- Order: Coleoptera
- Suborder: Polyphaga
- Infraorder: Cucujiformia
- Family: Chrysomelidae
- Subfamily: Chrysomelinae
- Tribe: Chrysomelini
- Genus: Trochalonota; Westwood, 1833
- Species: T. badia

Binomial name
- Trochalonota badia (Germar, 1823)

Synonyms
- Chrysomela badia Germar, 1823; Chrysomela coccinelloides Sturm, 1826; Trochalonota annulata Dejean, 1836 (nomen nudum)

Genus of beetles

Trochalonota is a genus of beetle of the family Chrysomelidae. It is monotypic, being represented by the single species, Trochalonota badia, which is endemic to the Atlantic Forest in southeastern Brazil (Espírito Santo, Rio de Janeiro).

== Description ==
Adults reach a length of about 6.6–7.9 mm (0.26–0.31 in). They have a hemispherical, light to reddish brown body. The pronotum and elytra are with or without dark brown, irregular maculae anteriorly to the posterior third, sometimes covering the entire elytral surface. The mandibular apices and antennomeres VII-XII are dark brown to black.
