= Cyrtonus elegans =

Scientific classification
- Domain: Eukaryota
- Kingdom: Animalia
- Phylum: Arthropoda
- Class: Insecta
- Order: Coleoptera
- Suborder: Polyphaga
- Infraorder: Cucujiformia
- Family: Chrysomelidae
- Subfamily: Chrysomelinae
- Genus: Cyrtonus
- Species: C. elegans

Binomial name
- Cyrtonus elegans (Germar, 1813)

Synonyms
- Eumolpus elegans Germar, 1813; Cyrtonus corruscans Vuillefroy, 1868

Species of beetle

Cyrtonus elegans is a species of leaf beetle in the subfamily Chrysomelinae found in Portugal.
