= Cadiz hardyi =

Scientific classification
- Domain: Eukaryota
- Kingdom: Animalia
- Phylum: Arthropoda
- Class: Insecta
- Order: Coleoptera
- Suborder: Polyphaga
- Infraorder: Cucujiformia
- Family: Chrysomelidae
- Subfamily: Chrysomelinae
- Tribe: Chrysomelini
- Genus: Cadiz; Andrews & Gilbert, 1992
- Species: C. hardyi

Binomial name
- Cadiz hardyi Andrews & Gilbert, 1992

Genus of beetles

Cadiz is a genus of leaf beetles in the subfamily Chrysomelinae, found in North America. It contains only one species, Cadiz hardyi, which was described from the Cadiz Dunes in San Bernardino County, California.
