= Pixis =

Scientific classification
- Kingdom: Animalia
- Phylum: Arthropoda
- Clade: Pancrustacea
- Class: Insecta
- Order: Coleoptera
- Suborder: Polyphaga
- Infraorder: Cucujiformia
- Family: Chrysomelidae
- Subfamily: Chrysomelinae
- Tribe: Chrysomelini
- Genus: Pixis; Chevrolat, 1843

Synonyms
- Pyxis Stål, 1860

Genus of beetles

Pixis is a genus of leaf beetles of the family Chrysomelidae.

== Species ==
- Pixis atriceps (Stål, 1860)
- Pixis clavigera (Stål, 1860)
- Pixis columbina (Stål, 1860)
- Pixis erotyloides (Stål, 1860)
- Pixis holmgreni (Stål, 1860)
- Pixis indiga (Stål, 1860)
- Pixis proteus (Stål, 1860)
- Pixis bogotensis Kirsch, 1870
