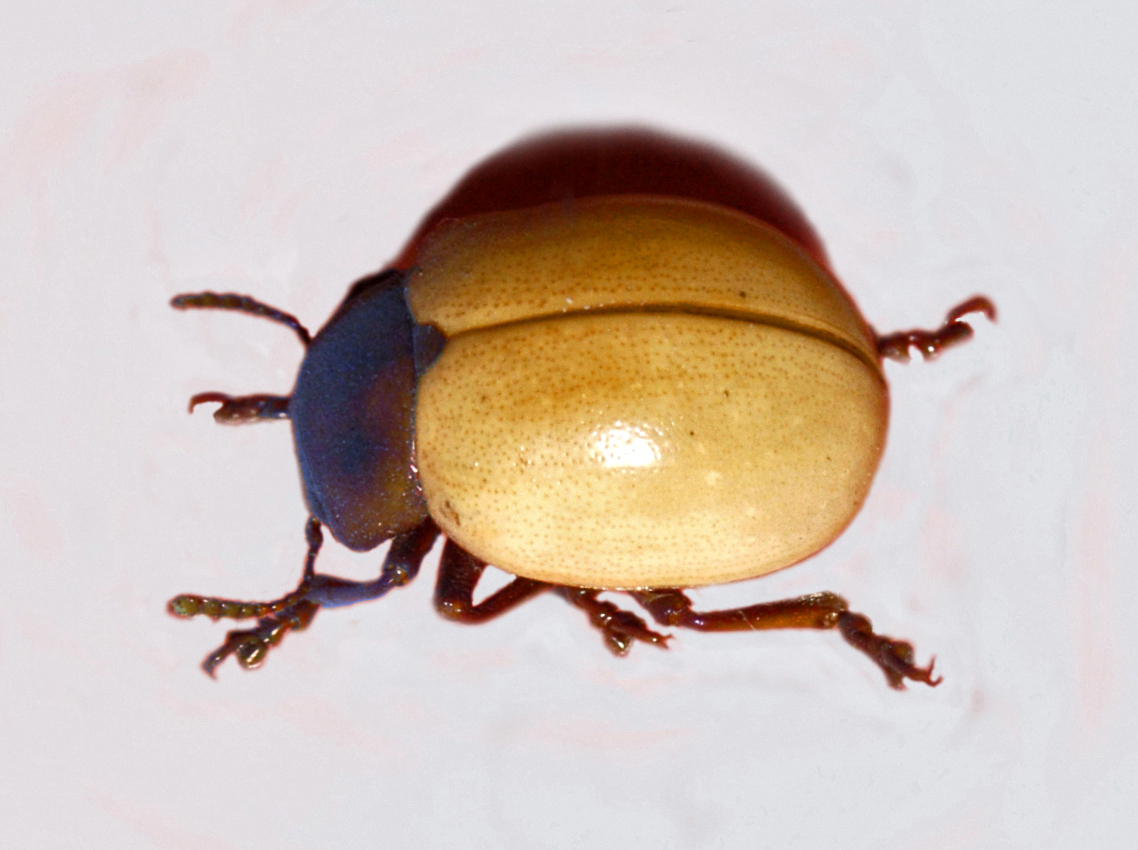
- Museum specimen of Humba cyanicollis

Scientific classification
- Kingdom: Animalia
- Phylum: Arthropoda
- Class: Insecta
- Order: Coleoptera
- Suborder: Polyphaga
- Infraorder: Cucujiformia
- Family: Chrysomelidae
- Subfamily: Chrysomelinae
- Genus: Humba; Chen, 1934

Synonyms
- Eumela Baly, 1875; Eumelaella Strand, 1935

= Humba (beetle) =

Genus of beetles

Humba is a genus of beetles belonging to the family Chrysomelidae.

== Species ==
- Humba balyi (Jacoby 1893)
- Humba cyanicollis (Hope 1831)
- Humba flava (Linnaeus 1758)
- Humba gracilis (Schulthess 1894)
- Humba hyalodes Johnston, H. B., 1956
- Humba miniatipennis Johnston, H. B., 1956
