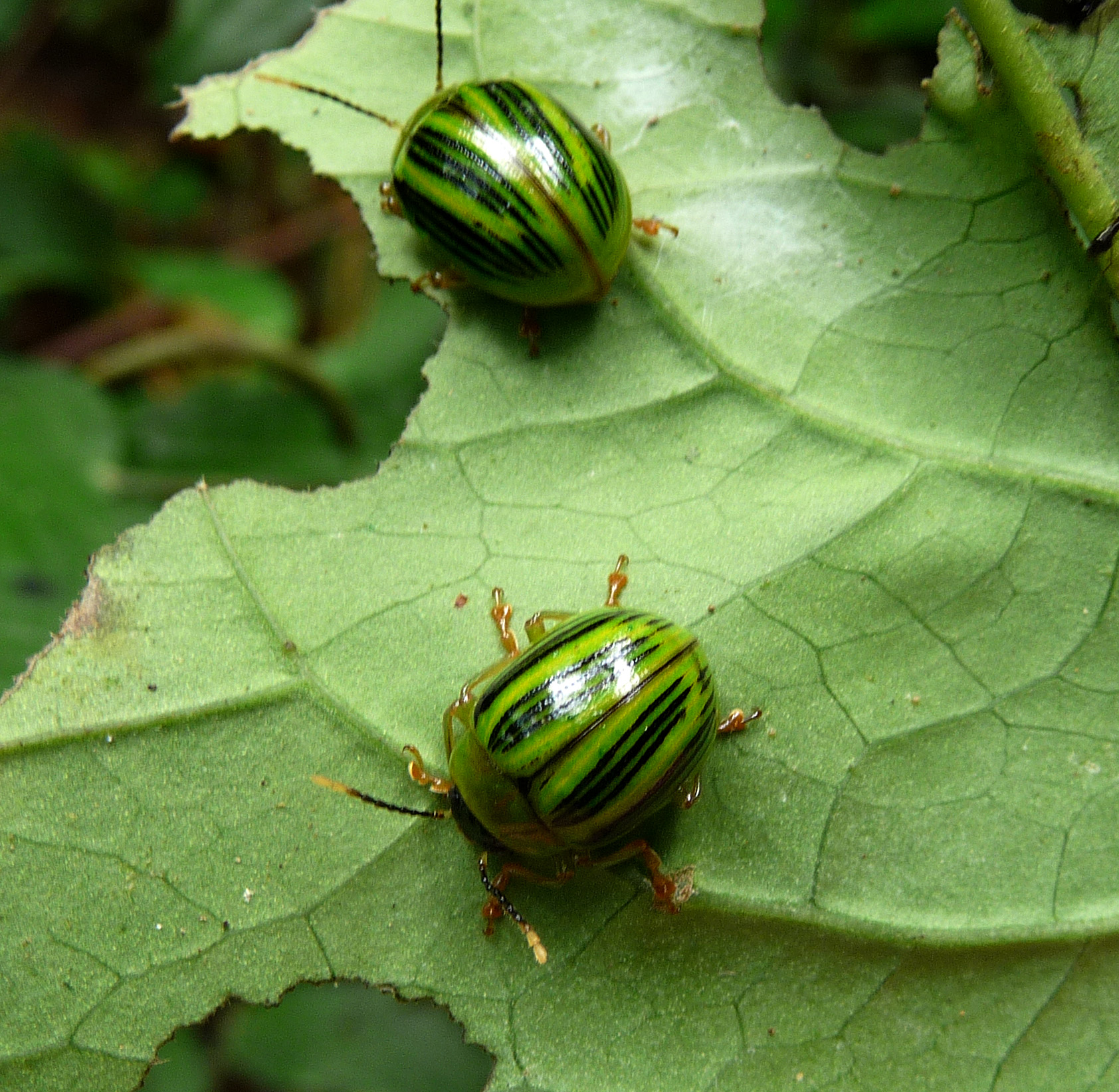
- Proseicela antennalis

Scientific classification
- Domain: Eukaryota
- Kingdom: Animalia
- Phylum: Arthropoda
- Class: Insecta
- Order: Coleoptera
- Suborder: Polyphaga
- Infraorder: Cucujiformia
- Family: Chrysomelidae
- Tribe: Chrysomelini
- Genus: Proseicela; Chevrolat, 1836

Species
- See text

= Proseicela =

Genus of beetles

Proseicela is a genus of leaf beetles.

== Taxonomy ==
The genus Proseicela Chevrolat is assigned to the Chrysomelidae beetle tribe Chrysomelini (in subfamily Chrysomelinae). A single species has been sampled in the molecular-based phylogeny of Chrysomelinae.

== Species ==
- Proseicela antennalis (Kirsch, 1883)
- Proseicela bicruciata Jacoby
- Proseicela bivittata
- Proseicela boliviensista
- Proseicela egensis Stal, 1869
- Proseicela ecuadoriensis (Jacoby, 1903)?
- Proseicela flavipennis
- Proseicela maculata
- Proseicela signifera
- Proseicela spectabilis (Baly)
- Proseicela vittata (Fabricius)

== Behaviour ==
Maternal guarding (a form of subsociality) of small broods of eggs and larvae is known in P. bivittata and in P. vittata in French Guiana, P. bicruciata in Ecuador, P. spectabilis in Ecuador, and an unidentified species, Proseicela sp. in Ecuador.
