= Stenaspidiotus =

Scientific classification
- Domain: Eukaryota
- Kingdom: Animalia
- Phylum: Arthropoda
- Class: Insecta
- Order: Coleoptera
- Suborder: Polyphaga
- Infraorder: Cucujiformia
- Family: Chrysomelidae
- Subfamily: Chrysomelinae
- Tribe: Chrysomelini
- Genus: †Stenaspidiotus; Poinar, 2013
- Species: †S. microptilus

Binomial name
- †Stenaspidiotus microptilus Poinar, 2013

Extinct genus of leaf beetle

Stenaspidiotus is an extinct genus of leaf beetle in the subfamily Chrysomelinae. It contains a single species, Stenaspidiotus microptilus. It was erected in 2013 by George Poinar Jr.

== Discovery ==
The type specimen was located in a fragment of amber from the Cordillera Septentrional in the Dominican Republic. The amber dates from between 15–20 to 30–45 million years ago.

== Description ==
The adult beetle preserved in amber is 10.2 mm in length with a metallic brown-black colouration.
