= Colaphellus bowringi =

Scientific classification
- Kingdom: Animalia
- Phylum: Arthropoda
- Clade: Pancrustacea
- Class: Insecta
- Order: Coleoptera
- Suborder: Polyphaga
- Infraorder: Cucujiformia
- Family: Chrysomelidae
- Genus: Colaphellus
- Species: C. bowringi

Binomial name
- Colaphellus bowringi (Baly, 1865)

Species of beetle

Colaphellus bowringi (also known as the cabbage beetle and the large cabbage beetle) is a species of leaf beetle. It was first characterized by English entomologist Joseph Sugar Baly in 1865 and is primarily found in southeastern China, as well as other areas of Asia.

The cabbage beetle consumes cruciferous vegetables commonly eaten by humans. For this reason, it is a pest and finding sustainable insecticides against it is a subject of ongoing research. It goes through egg, larval, pupal, and adult stages where temperature and geographic location impact development. As an adult, C. bowringi can be active and receptive to reproduction, or in diapause. Ovary development and oviposition are highly regulated by signaling pathways, such as the Mitogen-activated protein kinase pathway.

C. bowringi is often studied for its highly specific mating behavior. Males and females are sexually dimorphic (most notably in body weight) and copulate around five times in an average day of mating. Their mate choice is influenced by age and geographic origin of potential mates. Mating duration has been found to vary depending on the time of day, whether partners have previously mated with each other, whether the female has previously mated at all, density of males in the mating population, temperature, and geographical location. In addition, there is evidence for assortative mating and some incompatible mating between populations of C. bowringi from different locations.

== Description ==
=== Anatomy ===
C. bowringi has two elytra (hardened forewings). Some of its sensory organs include the antenna (primarily for olfaction), proboscis (the feeding tube), and maxillary palps (primarily for gustation). It has an alimentary canal where the midgut is lined with a brush border of microvilli. For digestion, it has enzymes like proteases that can hydrolyze and activate proteins. The fluid in the midgut tends to be basic.

=== Sexual dimorphism ===
The cabbage beetle has historically been difficult to determine the sex of, although systems for discrimination exist for both living pupae and living adults. A system was devised using morphological characteristics from pupal males and females at two days old. They are most easily distinguished by their genital opening (or lack thereof) and ventral protuberances below. Female pupae have a genital opening that's located on the ventral side of the abdomen, between the eighth and ninth abdominal segments. On the ninth abdominal segment, there are two protuberances, located so that the genital opening is generally in the center of them laterally. Male pupae do not have a genital opening or protuberances. Micrographs may aid in sex determination of pupae.

The male and female pupae are roughly the same size. From a sample of 74 pupae (31 male and 43 female), males were 4.6 to 5.0 mm (0.18 to 0.20 in) in length and 2.7 to 3.2 mm (0.11 to 0.13 in) in width. Conversely, females were measured to be 4.7 to 5.2 mm (0.19 to 0.20 in) in length and 2.9 to 3.4 mm (0.11 to 0.13 in) in width. These were pupae that were analyzed in experimental conditions at 25 °C (77 °F), not in nature.

Interestingly, while the dimensions of the male and female pupae do not greatly vary between sex, body weight does. Female larvae, pupae, and adults have larger body weights than males, regardless of temperature, meaning Colaphellus bowringi exhibits a female biased sexual size dimorphism. Several patterns for body weight and temperature have also been found. As the temperature at which the beetles were raised increases, the body weight decreases. With an increase in temperature, the sexual dimorphism in size increases. Both sexes have their largest body weight at 19 °C (66 °F). Colaphellus bowringi's patterns in sexual size dimorphism follow Rensch's rule.

== Geographic range ==
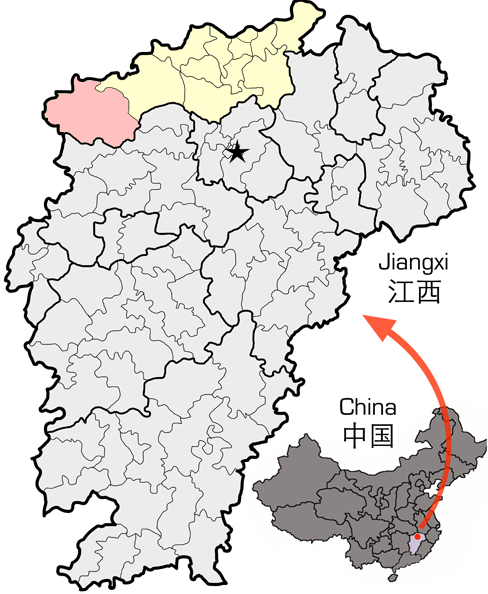
Habitat of Colaphellus bowringi in southeastern China.

Colaphellus bowringi is found across China and several other Asian countries. It is known to be present in mountainous regions, particularly in the southeastern parts of China, including Jiangxi province. The species has been documented in various specific locations within the province, including Xiushui County. A population of C. bowringi has also been found in Shenyang, a city in the northeastern Chinese province Liaoning.

Furthermore, there are observed differences in life-history traits between populations of Colaphellus bowringi from different geographical regions. Mechanisms of diapause induction and photoperiodic reactions vary based on latitude of the beetles' home. This may be due to the varying environmental conditions present at different geographic locations. Additionally, there exists a level of assortative mating, and therefore some mating incompatibility between Colaphellus bowringi of stark geographic locations.

== Food resources ==
The cabbage beetle relies mostly on cruciferous vegetables as its food source throughout different stages of its life cycle. This includes eating the leaves of various plants such as radish (Raphanus sativus), turnip (Brassica rapa var. rapa), and Chinese cabbages (Cleome gynandra, Brassica pekinensis, Brassica campestris, and Brassica chinensis var. parachinensis). Both larvae and adults of C. bowringi are known to consume the leaves of at least some of these crucifers. They have been noted to consume leaves that are still developing, in particular.

Cabbage beetles also eat these leaves in experimental conditions and artificial environments, if provided.

== Life history ==
=== Life cycle ===
Colaphellus bowringi has a life cycle with distinct stages and behaviors. The comprehensive analysis of the C. bowringi life cycle outlined below originated from laboratory experiments rather than natural observation. Thus, the beetles lived under laboratory conditions where the temperature varied within a range for each developmental stage.

In general, C. bowringi progress through egg, larval, pupal, and adult stages. Then, in the adult stage, they may reproduce or be under diapause. At 25 °C (77 °F), the average beetle took less than 18 days to progress from an egg to an adult. Development in some stages varies by geographical location, a phenomenon that has been studied specifically with changes in latitude.

==== Egg stage ====
When temperatures range from 15 to 30 °C (59 to 86 °F), eggs hatch experimentally between 3.14 and 13.78 days. The minimum temperature requirement for egg development is approximately 10.7 °C (51.3 °F).

==== Larval stage ====
After hatching, oocyte generation and maturation of the larvae occurs. The larval stage lasts between 6.95 and 22.83 days under temperatures 15 to 30 °C (59 to 86 °F). The minimum temperature requirement for larvae is 8.8 °C (47.8 °F), but as temperature increases, larval growth rate increases. As latitude increases, the length of the larval stage increases and growth rate decreases.

==== Pupal stage ====
C. bowringi spends about 3.18 to 12.10 days in the pupal stage under 15 to 30 °C (59 to 86 °F) laboratory conditions. The developmental temperature threshold is 9.6 °C (49.3 °F) at this stage. Like in the larval stage, pupal growth rate increases when temperature increases. Both sexes lose weight at metamorphosis, but male pupae lose more weight. Additionally, the more pupae weigh, the more weight they tend to lose at metamorphosis. Unlike the larval stage, the length of the pupal stage does not vary with latitude. However, as latitude increases, the body weight of pupae decreases.

==== Adult stage ====
Adults of C. bowringi aestivate and hibernate in soil naturally, and specifically burrow to depths of 9 to 31 cm (3.5 to 12.2 in) in experimental conditions. At 15 to 30 °C (59 to 86 °F), the lifespan of adults varies from 1 to 2 months for non-diapausing adults and 5 to 38 months for diapausing adults.

=== Inheritance of life history traits ===
Offspring exhibit life history characteristics (including fecundity, length of larval development period, body weight, growth rate, and amount of weight loss occurring during metamorphosis) that are a mix of their father and mother. However, maternal effects are stronger, so when the parents differ in their life history traits, offspring have traits closer to those of their mother.

== Genetics ==
The transcriptome of C. bowringi closely resembles that of other beetles, specifically in regard to the location of antennal olfactory and gustatory genes. Most of the identified antennal genes are related to structure (cell parts and organelles), metabolic processes, and molecular activities (such as binding, catalyst, and transporter functions). It has many non-coding genes as well. A lot of C. bowringi genes have not been identified: they have no gene ontology term and have potentially recently evolved or are specific to the species.

== Mating ==
=== Mate choice ===
The age of females impacts mating success. Virgin middle-aged males tend to have a better chance of mating with middle-aged females compared to females of other ages (young and old). This pairing leads to faster mating, longer copulation, and increased fecundity. As a result, middle-aged males have increased reproductive success when they breed with middle-aged females. However, male longevity is not impacted by the age of the female they mate with.

The age of males also impacts mating success. Similarly, all females, regardless of age (young, middle-aged, old), expressed preferential mating with middle-aged males. Breeding with middle-aged males has the benefit of more eggs hatching, which benefits the females' reproductive success. A middle-aged male mate leads to a higher quantity of eggs compared to an old male. The length of mating increases as male age increases. However, female longevity is not impacted by their male mate's age.

In both of these elucidated patterns, middle-aged is defined as 15 days old.

When males and females from different populations have a choice to mate, there are much more intra-population matings (male and female from the same population) than inter-population matings (male and female from separate populations), suggesting assortative mating. The offspring of inter-population matings are less likely to hatch, and female longevity decreases, suggesting some mating incompatibility.

=== Copulation ===
Colaphellus bowringi engages in copulation in order to reproduce. Both males and females participate in multiple mating events throughout their reproductive periods. During the spring, C. bowringi reproduces to create only one generation of offspring. However, during the autumn season, these beetles undergo multiple reproductive cycles and produce three new generations. In terms of mating frequency, both males and females of C. bowringi have been observed to copulate approximately five times a day.

The start of copulation in C. bowringi is defined by the male's aedeagus entering the female genitalia. During copulation, the aedeagus aids in transferring the sperm to the female. Copulation ends when the male's aedeagus leaves the female genitalia.

=== Mating duration ===
The time of day at which copulation occurs impacts duration. The mating duration is the longest at 8:00am and then decreases as the day progresses. Past mating history of the female impacts duration: a male mating with a female that had previously mated is longer than the same male mating with a virgin female. However, there is no significant difference in mating duration based on whether the male has a mating history or is a virgin.

Additional factors that may influence mating duration include the density of males, familiarity of males, temperature, and origin of partners. Mating duration decreases as the density of males in the population increases. But if a female has already mated with a specific male before, their following mating will last longer. Mating duration decreases as temperature increases, from 22 to 25 to 28 °C (72 to 77 to 82 °F). Finally, when males and females from different geographic locations are mated together, they take longer to start and mate for a shorter time. Thus, inter-population partners engage in longer mating durations than intra-population partners. While experimental, these results exhibit great variation in mating duration based on geographical location and other environmental conditions.

One hypothesis suggests that a longer copulation may lead to more sperm remaining inside the female, making it advantageous for males. Males may also put in more resources for a longer copulation, which is advantageous to the female.

=== Polygamy ===
Females will mate with multiple males, whether it is a repeated or novel mating partner. However, when given a choice, females tend to mate with a male they already mated with—in other words, they remain monogamous, if possible. Monogamous females not only have a longer lifespan, but have more viable eggs and more of their eggs hatch, as compared to polyandrous females.

== Physiology ==
=== Olfaction (smell) and gustation (taste) ===
Like other beetles, C. bowringi relies on olfaction for a variety of processes like finding oviposition sites or mates. Their antennae are important sensory organs for olfaction and gustation. Many antennal genes have been identified, including those coding for 26 odorant-binding proteins (OBPs), 43 olfactory receptors (ORs), 10 gustatory receptors (GRs), 12 chemosensory proteins (CSPs), 4 sensory neuron membrane proteins (SNMPs), and 9 ionotropic receptors (IRs). The olfactory neurons are bathed in sensillar lymph which facilitates their binding to odorants. Some olfactory receptors have higher expression in males compared to females, and vice versa, but none found are only expressed in either sex. Less candidate antennal gustatory genes have been found (compared to olfactory genes) since gustation is mostly managed in the proboscis and maxillary palps.

=== Diapause ===
The cabbage beetle is often studied for its diapause pattern. Diapause is a temporary cessation in development that some beetles will enter if environmental conditions are not advantageous. C. bowringi will bury into soil during diapause. Across the process of diapause, beetles go through pre-diapause (induction, preparation), diapause itself (initiation, maintenance, termination), and post-diapause. In the induction phase of pre-diapause, C. bowringi takes in environmental information which is used to decide whether diapause is favorable. During the preparation phase of pre-diapause, the quantity of proteins related to carbohydrate and lipid metabolism and energy production and conservation changes. In particular, fatty acid-binding protein (FABP) accumulates in the head of females.

These beetles may go under diapause in the winter and summer in order to survive extreme temperatures. Members of C. bowringi can be a summer diapause, winter diapause, prolonged diapause, or non-diapause adult. Prolonged diapause is when the beetle does not emerge from diapause for over a year. There is no set duration C. bowringi must be under diapause: it can vary from a few months to several years, even between beetles that entered diapause at the same time. Beetles that emerge from diapause do so from late February to early April for spring reproduction or from mid August to early October for autumn reproduction.

Photoperiod can influence diapause in some populations but not others. For those that are affected, adult female C. bowringi are non-diapause-destined under a short-day photoperiod, and are diapause-destined under a long-day photoperiod. When they become diapause-destined, they stop yolk collection and ovarian development; if non-diapause-destined, these processes are active. Temperature alone can induce diapause in beetles as well, but overall the relationship between environmental cues for the induction of diapause is complex and not fully understood.

The molecular mechanisms behind diapause are not fully elucidated, but there is evidence for diapause occurring when juvenile hormone (JH) is absent, triggering less vitellogenin (Vg) transcription.

== Oviposition mechanism and regulation ==
=== Ovary development ===
The ovary development process in C. bowringi progresses through distinct stages, including Grade 0, I, II, III, and IV. Grade 0 is characterized by a white and transparent ovary with thread-shaped ovariole. Grade I has a more tubular ovariole and yolk begins to accumulate. In Grade II, yolk continues to accumulate and the ovary continues to get larger. By Grade III, there are some mature eggs, but none in the lateral oviduct. A Grade IV ovary has mature eggs in both the ovariole and lateral oviduct.

Pre-oviposition in C. bowringi is about 3 to 4 days, and is followed by oviposition. The oviposition behavior involves a prolonged egg-laying period. Most females are capable of laying eggs for over a month, with 67 days as the longest recorded period in one experiment. The typical egg-laying period is between 30 and 60 days. During this time, females exhibit considerable fecundity, with the ability to produce a substantial number of eggs. In the spring generation, a typical female produces approximately 644 eggs. Females reached higher levels in the autumn generation, rearing roughly 963 eggs. One female was even recorded to have laid 1,950 eggs.

=== Mating regulation ===
Ovarian growth and oviposition in C. bowringi are highly regulated. They are processes that involve intricate signaling pathways. One pathway of interest is the MAPK (Mitogen-activated protein kinase) signaling pathway. ERK (extracellular signal-regulated kinase), MEK (MAPK-ERK kinase), KSR2 (RAS 2 kinase suppressor), and P38—all parts of the pathway—play an important role in promoting ovarian development and high fecundity. In particular, current studies suggest ERK is involved in ecdysone synthesis, and P38 regulates growth and differentiation of germline stem cells.

Another key molecule is vitellogenin (Vg), which is made in fat bodies and accumulates in ovaries (a process called vitellogenesis). There is evidence for juvenile hormone (JH) and 20-hydroxyecdysone (20E) as regulators of vitellogenesis. Vg triggers maturation of oocytes in the ovaries of C. bowringi, making it, JH, and 20E all key molecules in oviposition.

Interestingly, research indicates that eggs produced from monogamous and polyandrous C. bowringi matings exhibit no significant difference in quantity. However, eggs from monogamous mothers hatched more often (compared to eggs from polyandrous mothers) and are considered more viable.

== Interactions with humans ==
=== Pest of crop plants ===
Because Colaphellus bowringi consumes cruciferous vegetables such as turnips, radishes, and cabbages, it is a significant pest for humans, especially in China. Its consumption reduces the amount of vegetables that can be sold, harming the economy. This effect is exacerbated in part by the high reproductive potential of each female: these beetles can rapidly multiply, making them difficult to eliminate. Very few pesticides or strategies work against C. bowringi, making it a target for research. One example is products Cry9Eb2 and Cry9Ee1 which can inhibit other insects but not C. bowringi. An additional problem is that the pesticides that do work against C. bowringi are largely synthetic chemicals (as opposed to organic pesticides or biopesticides) which are especially detrimental to the environment. These pesticides leave traces on crops, which then endangers the humans who consume them.

=== Pest control ===
One well-explored solution is the use of crystal (Cry) proteins, which are often used against beetles and other insects. In insect larvae, they activate protoxins, bind to a receptor, and result in toxicity to the organism. One challenge is that Cry proteins must be specific to their target. The Cry8 proteins in particular are effective against most beetles, including the leaf beetle family to which Colaphellus bowringi belongs. Another insecticidal option is exotoxins secreted during metabolism, such as Vegetative insecticidal protein (Vip) or Secreted insecticidal protein (Sip), with Sip working particularly well against beetles. The pathway of Sip1Ab causes microvilli in the midgut to swell and disintegrate over the course of three days. As a result of this process and potentially others, larvae of C. bowringi have larger intracellular spaces and exhibit reduced growth.

Another Cry-based insecticide is Cry3Aa. Its effect on the cabbage leaf beetle as well as other Chinese vegetable pests like the spotted asparagus beetle (Crioceris quatuordecimpunctata) and daikon leaf beetle (Phaedon brassicae) can be enhanced when applied with a peptide called rTmCad1p. The mortality rate can be quadrupled under a specific concentration ratio.

An insecticidal technique has also been developed against adult female C. bowringi in particular. Genetically disrupting genes through RNA interference (RNAi) can inhibit beetle growth. The damage on the targeted genes can impact the adult female endocrine system, causing C. bowringi to eat less and die.

One possible method of managing the pest is through the vitillogenin receptor (VgR). VgR is located in the ovaries of the beetle and plays an important role in oogenesis. The researchers found that absence of VgR could lead to reduced reproduction in the species. These results suggest that disrupting this receptor or its molecular pathway could be a potential method of controlling the species from damaging crops.
