= Paleophaedon =

Paleophaedon Temporal range: Late Eocene

Scientific classification
- Domain: Eukaryota
- Kingdom: Animalia
- Phylum: Arthropoda
- Class: Insecta
- Order: Coleoptera
- Suborder: Polyphaga
- Infraorder: Cucujiformia
- Family: Chrysomelidae
- Subfamily: Chrysomelinae
- Genus: †Paleophaedon; Nadein & Perkovsky, 2010
- Species: †P. minutus

Binomial name
- †Paleophaedon minutus Nadein & Perkovsky, 2010

Extinct genus of beetles

Paleophaedon is an extinct genus of chrysomeline leaf beetle described from the late Eocene Rovno amber of Ukraine. It was named by Konstantin Nadein and Evgeny Perkovsky in 2010, and the type species is Paleophaedon minutus.
