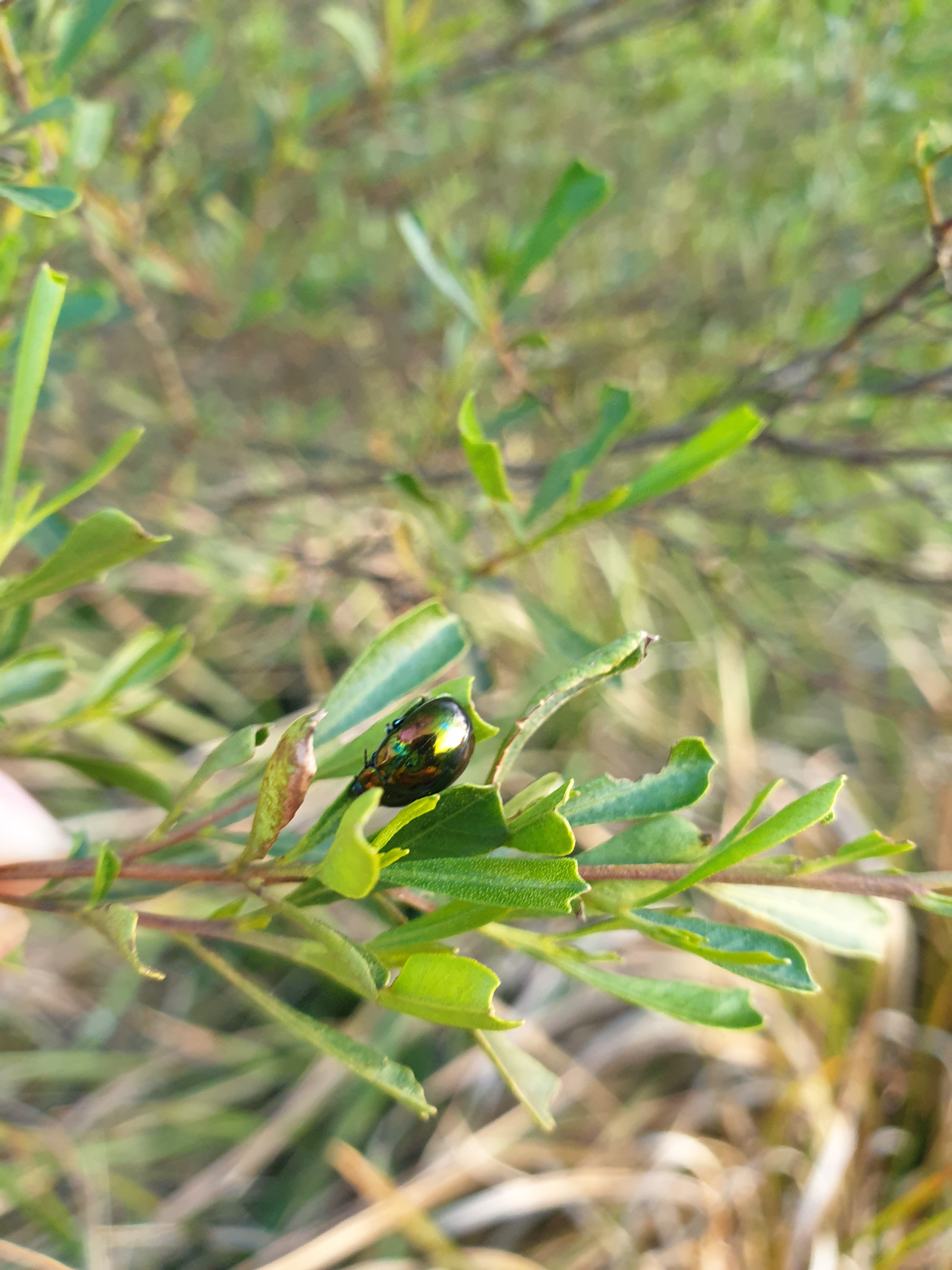
- A Dodonaea Beetle

Scientific classification
- Kingdom: Animalia
- Phylum: Arthropoda
- Class: Insecta
- Order: Coleoptera
- Suborder: Polyphaga
- Infraorder: Cucujiformia
- Family: Chrysomelidae
- Subfamily: Chrysomelinae
- Genus: Callidemum; Blanchard, 1853

Species
- See text

= Callidemum =

Genus of beetles

Callidemum is a genus of leaf beetles in the subfamily Chrysomelinae.

== Species ==
- Callidemum aemula Weise, 1923
- Callidemum atra (Lea, 1915)
- Callidemum balyi (Jacoby, 1895)
- Callidemum chlorophana (Lea, 1903)
- Callidemum circumfusa (Baly, 1856)
- Callidemum clavareaui (Lhoste, 1934)
- Callidemum cornuta (Baly, 1875)
- Callidemum cornutum (Baly, 1875)
- Callidemum discorufa (Lea, 1903)
- Callidemum dives (Baly, 1859)
- Callidemum flavicornis (Jacoby, 1894)
- Callidemum fulvitarsis (Jacoby, 1898)
- Callidemum hypochalceum
- Callidemum gibbosum (Baly, 1862)
- Callidemum iridipennis Weise, 1923
- Callidemum lateralis (Lea, 1903)
- Callidemum leai (Lhoste, 1934)
- Callidemum limbata (Baly, 1875)
- Callidemum monteithi Daccordi, 2003
- Callidemum nitidiceps (Lea, 1915)
- Callidemum olivacea (Jacoby, 1895)
- Callidemum ornata (Baly, 1859)
- Callidemum parryi (Baly, 1866)
- Callidemum poroptera (Baly, 1856)
- Callidemum prasina (Baly, 1856)
- Callidemum pretiosa (Baly, 1856)
- Callidemum subcincta Weise, 1923
- Callidemum tibialis (Lea, 1916)

Species moved to Paropsimorpha:

- Callidemum elegans (Baly, 1856): now Paropsimorpha elegans
