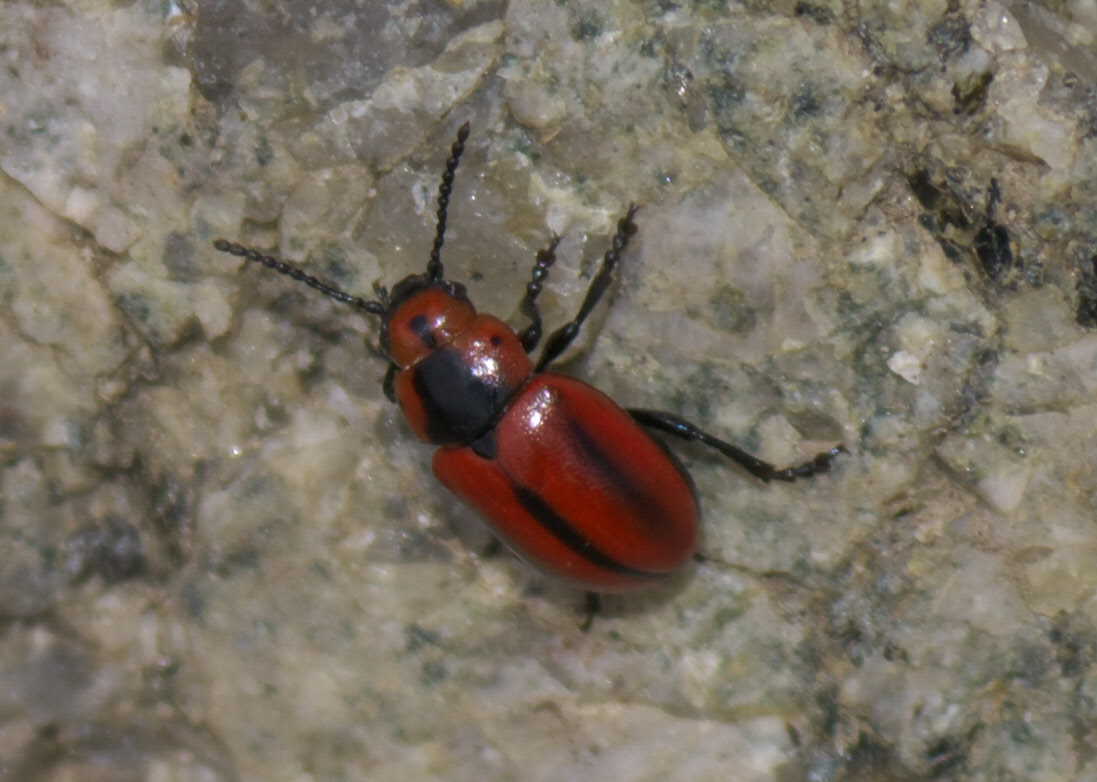

Scientific classification
- Domain: Eukaryota
- Kingdom: Animalia
- Phylum: Arthropoda
- Class: Insecta
- Order: Coleoptera
- Suborder: Polyphaga
- Infraorder: Cucujiformia
- Family: Chrysomelidae
- Genus: Entomoscelis
- Species: E. americana

Binomial name
- Entomoscelis americana Brown, 1942

= Entomoscelis americana =

Species of beetle

Entomoscelis americana, the red turnip beetle, is a species of leaf beetle in the family Chrysomelidae. It is found in North America.

In 2020, Entomoscelis americana was found to be a synonym of Entomoscelis adonidis from the Palearctic realm.
