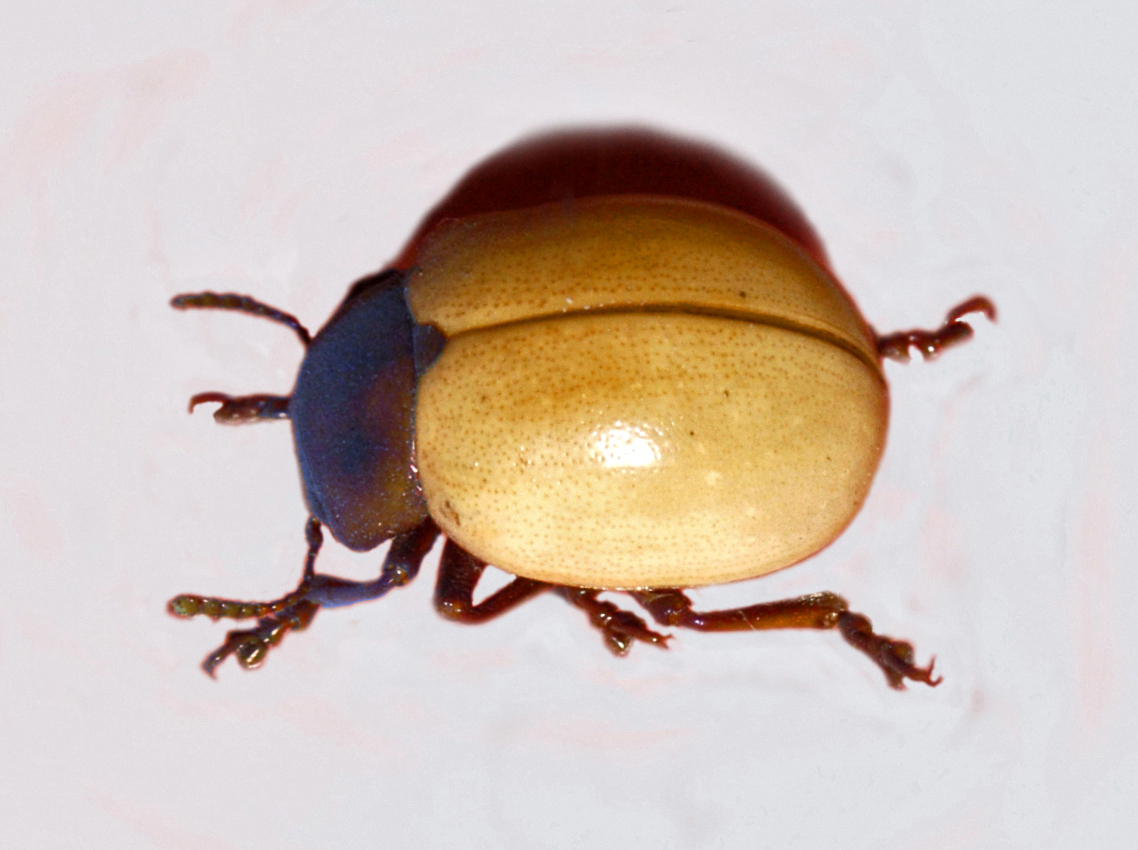
- Museum specimen of Humba cyanicollis

Scientific classification
- Kingdom: Animalia
- Phylum: Arthropoda
- Clade: Pancrustacea
- Class: Insecta
- Order: Coleoptera
- Suborder: Polyphaga
- Infraorder: Cucujiformia
- Family: Chrysomelidae
- Genus: Humba
- Species: H. cyanicollis

Binomial name
- Humba cyanicollis (Hope, 1831)

Synonyms
- Chrysomela cyanicollis Hope, 1831; Chrysomela pyrrhopyga STAL, 1857

= Humba cyanicollis =

Species of beetle

Humba cyanicollis is a species of beetles belonging to the family Chrysomelidae.

== Description ==
Humba cyanicollis can reach a length of about 14 mm and a width of about 8 mm. Body is oblong and convex. Pronotum is black-bluish, while elytrae are yellowish or orange.

== Distribution and habitat ==
This species of beetles has an Indian distribution. They mainly live in the Himalayan mountains (Nepal, Darjiling and Sikkim).
