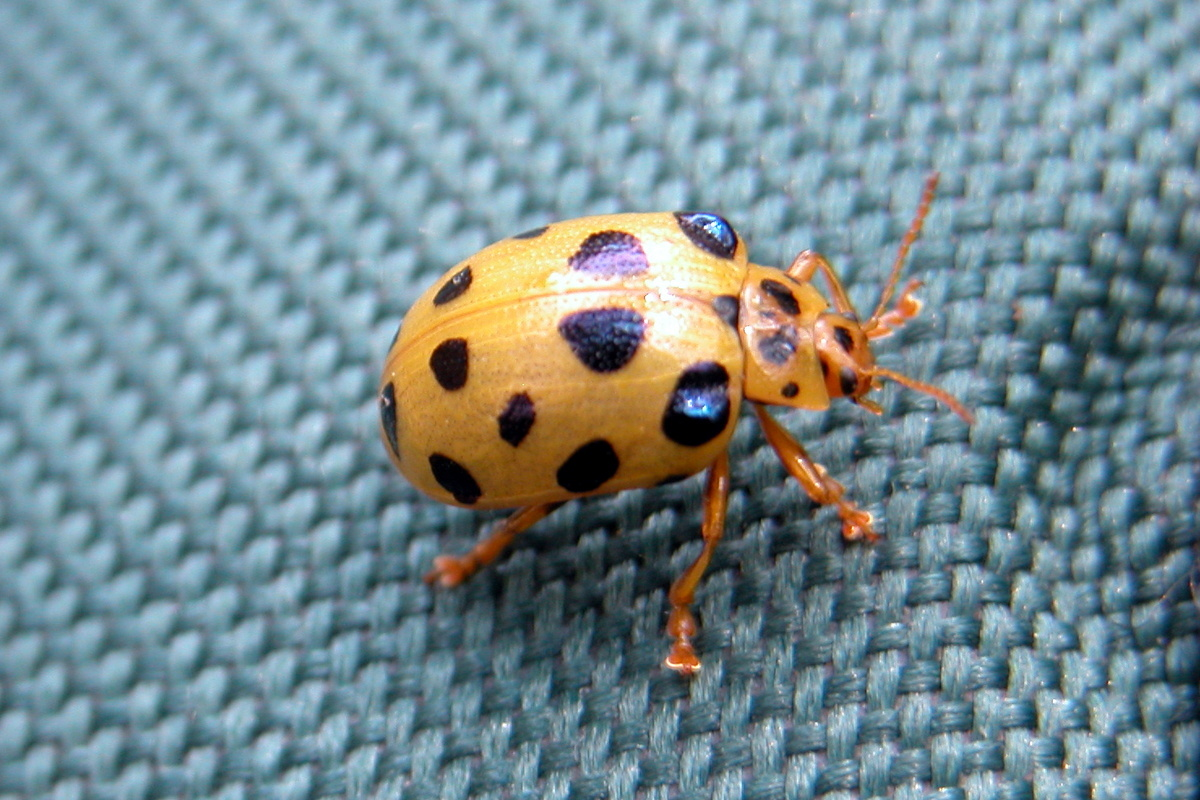
- Agasta formosa, West Bengal, India

Scientific classification
- Kingdom: Animalia
- Phylum: Arthropoda
- Clade: Pancrustacea
- Class: Insecta
- Order: Coleoptera
- Suborder: Polyphaga
- Infraorder: Cucujiformia
- Family: Chrysomelidae
- Subfamily: Chrysomelinae
- Tribe: Chrysomelini
- Genus: Agasta; Hope, 1840

Species
- See text

= Agasta =

Genus of leaf beetles

Agasta is a genus of leaf beetles in the subfamily Chrysomelinae distributed in South China and Indo-Malayan region.

== Species ==
Two species are included in the genus:

- Agasta annamica Kimoto & Gressitt, 1981 – Vietnam
- Agasta formosa Hope, 1840 – China, Vietnam, Laos, Thailand, Burma, India, Indonesia
