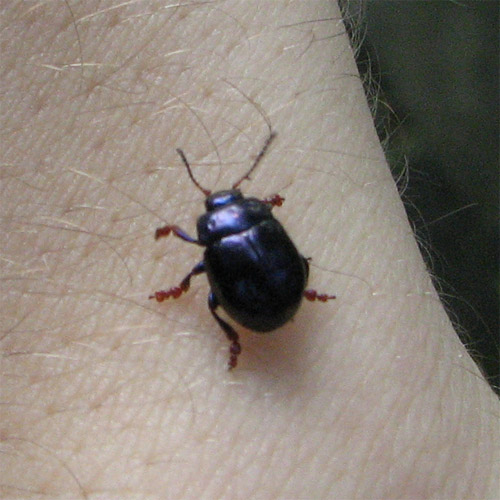
- Colaphellus sophiae
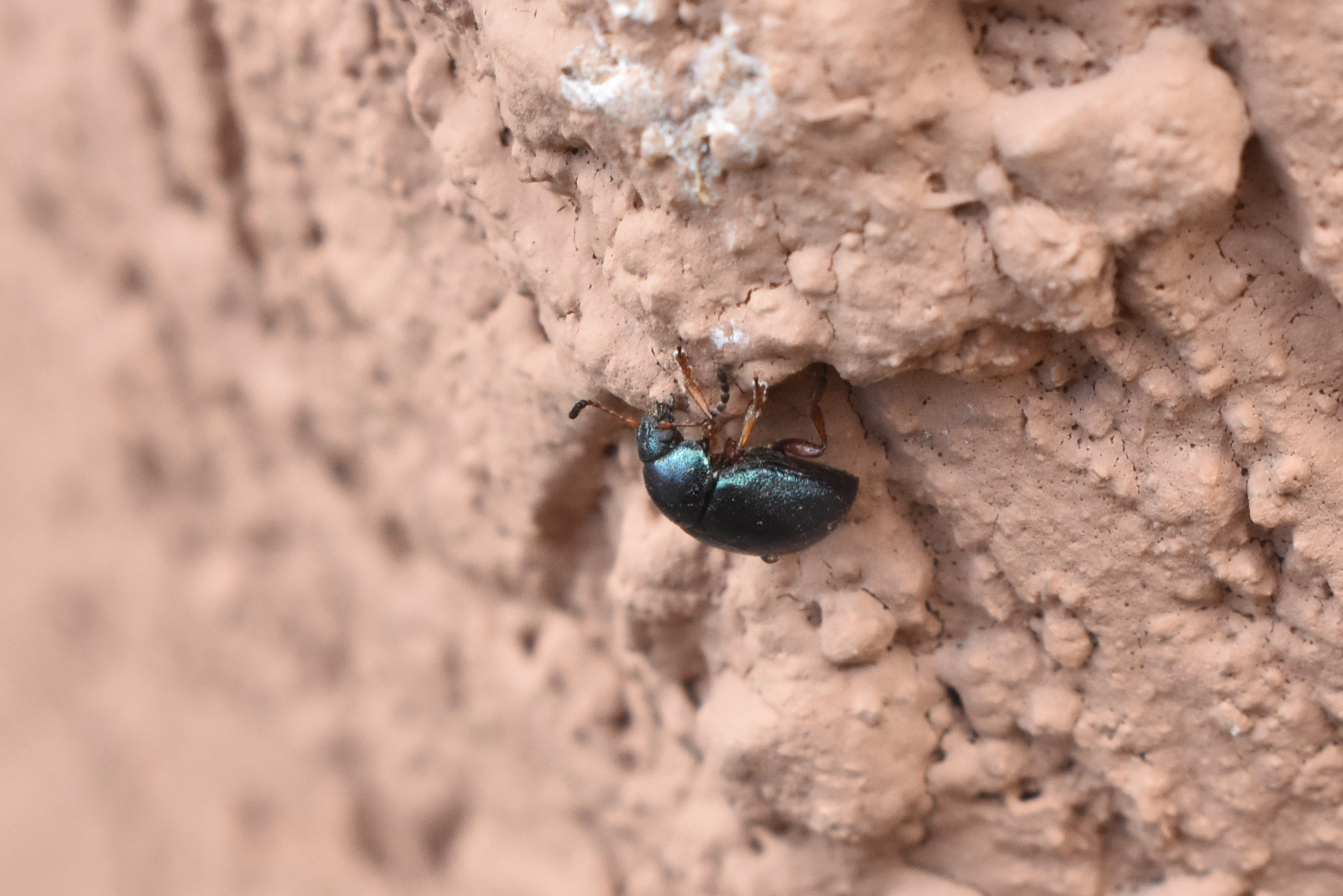
- Colaphellus apicalis

Scientific classification
- Domain: Eukaryota
- Kingdom: Animalia
- Phylum: Arthropoda
- Class: Insecta
- Order: Coleoptera
- Suborder: Polyphaga
- Infraorder: Cucujiformia
- Family: Chrysomelidae
- Subfamily: Chrysomelinae
- Genus: Colaphellus; Weise, 1916

Type species
- Chrysomela sophiae Schaller, 1783

Synonyms
- Colaphus Dahl, 1823 (published in a suppressed work); Colaphus L. Redtenbacher, 1845 (nec Dejean, 1836)

= Colaphellus =

Genus of leaf beetles

Colaphellus is a genus of Chrysomelinae (a subfamily of leaf beetles).

== Species ==
The genus contains the following species:

- Colaphellus alpicola (Warchałowski, 2004)
- Colaphellus apicalis (Ménétriés, 1849)
- Colaphellus bowringi (Baly, 1865)
- Colaphellus foveolatus (Gebler, 1848)
- Colaphellus jakutus Machatschke, 1954
- Colaphellus joliveti Bechyné, 1954
- Colaphellus nitidicollis (Weise, 1889)
- Colaphellus palaestinus (Achard, 1923)
- Colaphellus pulchellus (H. Lucas, 1846)
  - Colaphellus pulchellus arabicus (Medvedev, 1996)
  - Colaphellus pulchellus pulchellus (H. Lucas, 1846)
- Colaphellus sophiae (Schaller, 1783)
  - Colaphellus sophiae amasiae Machatschke, 1954
  - Colaphellus sophiae hoefti (Ménétriés, 1832)
  - Colaphellus sophiae sophiae (Schaller, 1783)
  - Colaphellus sophiae transsylvanicus Machatschke, 1954
- Colaphellus tenuipes (Weise, 1883)
- Colaphellus zarudnyi Medvedev, 1973
