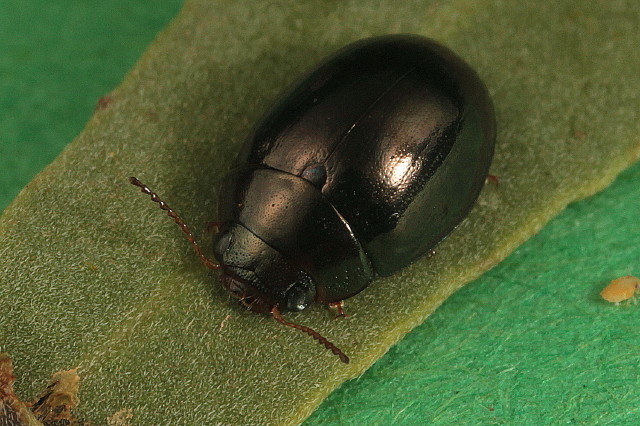
- Geomela sp.

Scientific classification
- Kingdom: Animalia
- Phylum: Arthropoda
- Class: Insecta
- Order: Coleoptera
- Suborder: Polyphaga
- Infraorder: Cucujiformia
- Family: Chrysomelidae
- Subfamily: Chrysomelinae
- Genus: Geomela; Lea, 1916

Species
- Geomela beatricis; Geomela bifoveata; Geomela blackburni; Geomela bryophaga; Geomela chiarae

= Geomela =

Genus of beetles

Geomela is a genus containing several small dark beetles in the family Chrysomelidae (leaf beetles). They are flat when compared with other leaf beetles. There are 13 species which occur mainly in the southeastern parts of Australia (Victoria, New South Wales, and eastern South Australia).
