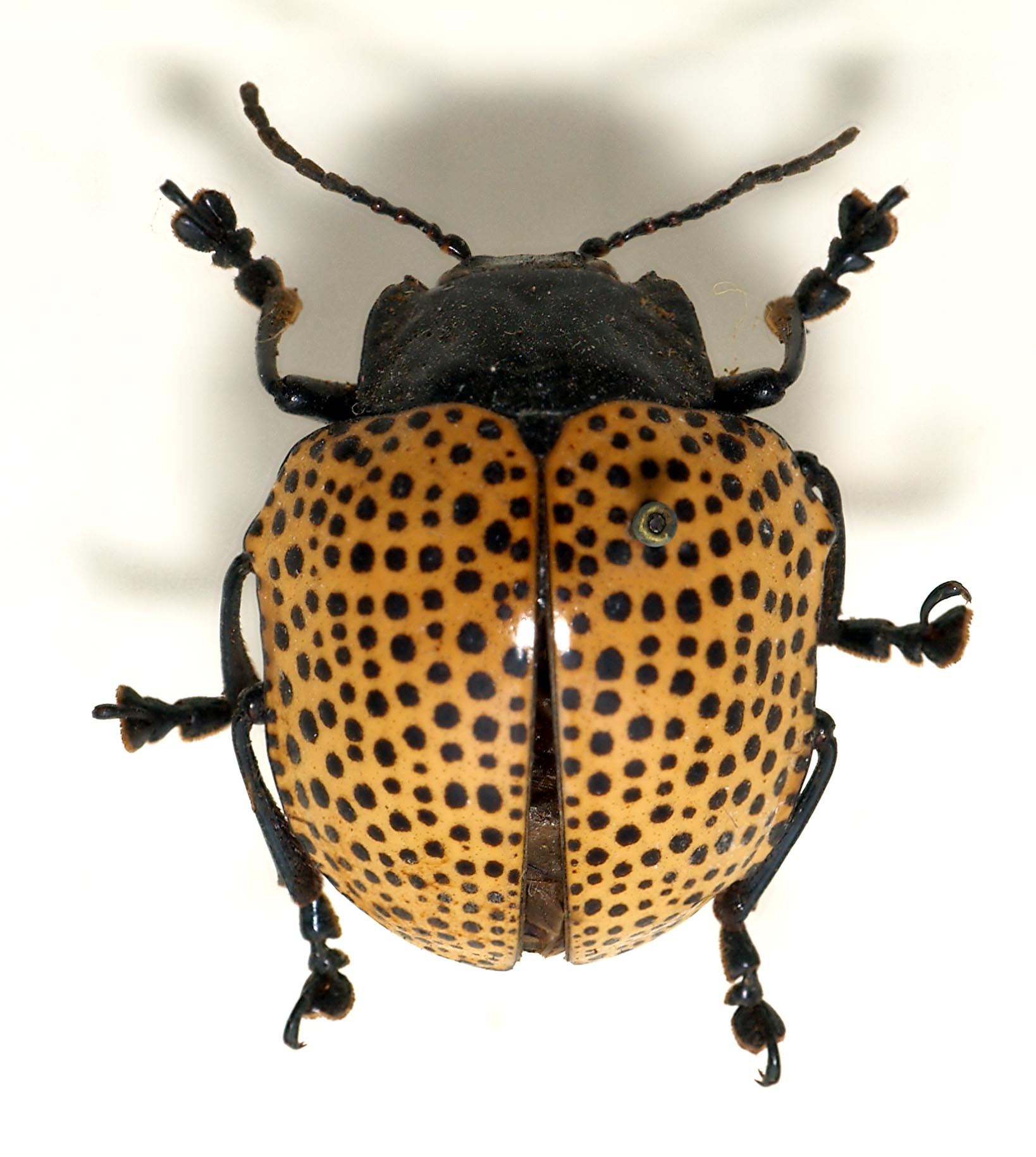
- Doryphora punctatissima

Scientific classification
- Domain: Eukaryota
- Kingdom: Animalia
- Phylum: Arthropoda
- Class: Insecta
- Order: Coleoptera
- Suborder: Polyphaga
- Infraorder: Cucujiformia
- Family: Chrysomelidae
- Tribe: Chrysomelini
- Genus: Doryphora; Illiger, 1807

= Doryphora (beetle) =

Genus of leaf beetles

Doryphora is a genus of leaf beetles in the family Chrysomelidae. It includes nine species from Central and South America.

== Biology ==
Doryphora beetles live and feed on vines of family Apocynaceae.

Doryphora reproduce during the transition from the dry to the wet season. Some species are subsocial, with adult females guarding their eggs and larvae from predation.

== Species ==
The genus includes the following species:

- Doryphora aeneoornata Stål, 1858
- Doryphora bella Baly, 1858
- Doryphora bioleyi (Achard)
- Doryphora centrumpunctata Achard, 1925
- Doryphora decemstillata Stål, 1858
- Doryphora diagonalis Stål, 1858
  - Doryphora diagonalis diagonalis Stål, 1858
  - Doryphora diagonalis ramulifera Achard, 1923
- Doryphora falleni Stål, 1859
- Doryphora impar Stål, 1859
- Doryphora insignicornis Stål, 1858
- Doryphora ligata Stål, 1858
- Doryphora paykulli (Stål, 1859)
- Doryphora princeps Gray, 1832
- Doryphora punctatissima (Olivier, 1790)
- Doryphora reticulata (Fabricius, 1787)
- Doryphora sallaei Stål, 1859
- Doryphora semiambita Stål, 1858
- Doryphora viridifasciata Jacoby, 1883
