= Paropsimorpha elegans =

Scientific classification
- Kingdom: Animalia
- Phylum: Arthropoda
- Clade: Pancrustacea
- Class: Insecta
- Order: Coleoptera
- Suborder: Polyphaga
- Infraorder: Cucujiformia
- Family: Chrysomelidae
- Genus: Paropsimorpha
- Species: P. elegans

Binomial name
- Paropsimorpha elegans (Baly, 1856)

Synonyms
- Augomela elegans Baly, 1856; Stethomela armiventris Lea, 1929

Species of beetle

Paropsimorpha elegans is a species of leaf beetle found in Australia.
