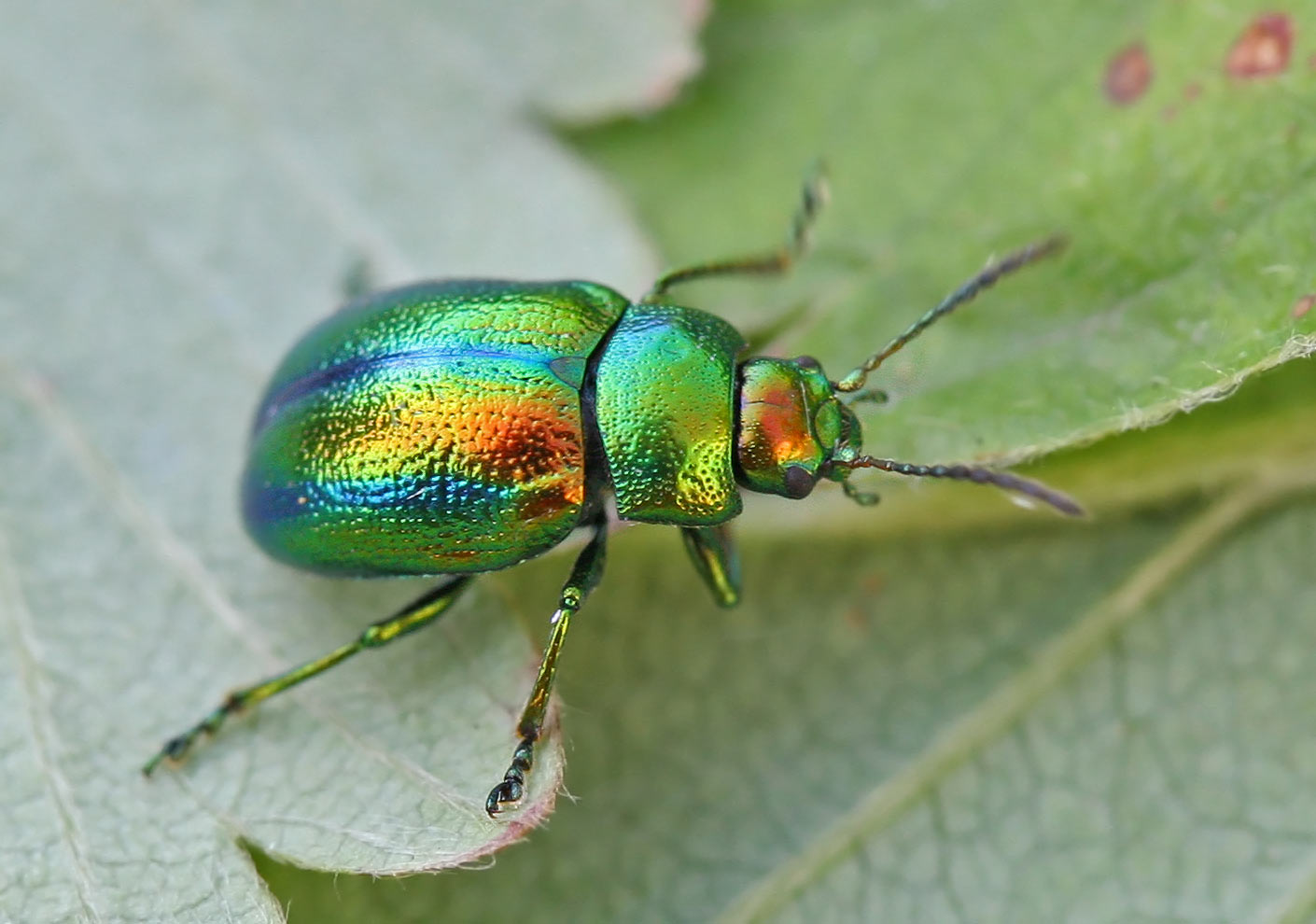

Scientific classification
- Kingdom: Animalia
- Phylum: Arthropoda
- Clade: Pancrustacea
- Class: Insecta
- Order: Coleoptera
- Suborder: Polyphaga
- Infraorder: Cucujiformia
- Family: Chrysomelidae
- Tribe: Chrysomelini
- Genus: Fasta; Petitpierre & Alonso-Zarazaga, 2019
- Species: F. fastuosa

Binomial name
- Fasta fastuosa (Scopoli, 1763)

Subspecies
- F. f. fastuosa (Scopoli, 1763); F. f. ventricosa (Suffrian, 1858)

Synonyms
- (Genus): Fastuolina Warchałowski, 1991; (Species) List: Coccinella fastuosa Scopoli, 1763; Chrysolina fastuosa (Scopoli, 1763); Chrysomela aenea Geoffroy, 1785; Chrysomela galeopsidis Schrank, 1798; Chrysomela subfastuosa Motschulsky, 1860; Chrysomela fastuosa var. cupreonitens Marseul, 1886; Chrysomela inexplicabilis Brancsik, 1910; Chrysomela fastuosa ab. obscura Fleischer, 1917; Chrysomela fastuosa ab. rugosicollis Fleischer, 1917; Chrysolina coromandeliana Maulik, 1926; Dlochrysa fastuosa andorrensis Bechyné, 1950; Dlochrysa fastuosa fastuosa ab. callichloris Bechyné, 1950; Dlochrysa fastuosa fastuosa ab. jodasi Bechyné, 1950; Chrysomela fastuosa var. biroi Csiki, 1953; Chrysomela fastuosa ab. revyi Kaszab, 1962

= Fasta =

Species of leaf beetle

F. fastuosa in copula

Fasta is a genus of leaf beetles in the family Chrysomelidae. It is monotypic, being represented by the single species Fasta fastuosa, also known as the dead-nettle leaf beetle. It is found in Europe to Central Asia, including the Caucasus even possibly northern Turkey and has also been recorded from North America, where it is an adventive species.

== Description ==
The species has a length ranging from 5.1–6.9 millimetres (0.20–0.27 in). F. fastuosa has a gold shine that transitions to a green or violet-blue longitudinal stripe near the shoulder band of the elytra as well as near the suture. Occasionally, specimens of F. fastuosa may be completely green or black in colour.

== Ecology ==
Adults and larvae of F. fastuosa feed on various plants in the family Lamiaceae, including hemp-nettle (Galeopsis) and dead-nettle (Lamium). It is also known from common nettle (Urtica dioica), which is in family Urticaceae. Adults and larvae graze on leaves, while larvae may also be found in fruiting calyxes.

Larvae are parasitised by the tachinid fly Macquartia grisea.

== Taxonomy ==
F. fastuosa was formerly classified in the genus Chrysolina, as the only member of the monotypic subgenus Fastuolina proposed by Warchałowski in 1991. Some authors consider the name "Fastuolina" to be an unavailable name under the International Code of Zoological Nomenclature, such as due to failure to comply with Article 13.1 as it was not accompanied by required text (or pointer to such text) that would differentiate the taxon. Hence later the new name Fasta was proposed for the subgenus by Petitpierre and Alonso-Zarazaga in 2019.

In 2023, a phylogenetic analysis based on DNA extracted from museum specimens recovered "C." fastuosa in a sister group relationship with the genus Oreina. These authors therefore raised the taxonomic rank of Fasta from subgenus to genus to reflect the uniqueness, resulting in the new combination Fasta fastuosa (Scopoli, 1763) for the species.
