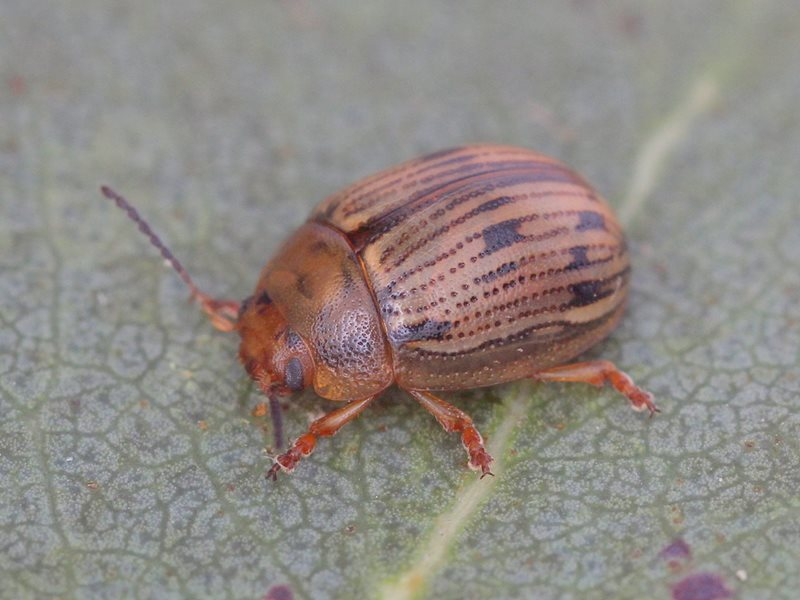
- Rhaebosterna interruptofasciata

Scientific classification
- Kingdom: Animalia
- Phylum: Arthropoda
- Class: Insecta
- Order: Coleoptera
- Suborder: Polyphaga
- Infraorder: Cucujiformia
- Family: Chrysomelidae
- Subfamily: Chrysomelinae
- Genus: Rhaebosterna; Weise, 1917

Species
- Rhaebosterna interruptofasciata; Rhaebosterna multimaculata; Rhaebosterna sciola

= Rhaebosterna =

Paropsine Leaf Beetle

Genus of beetles

Rhaebosterna is a genus of leaf beetles in the family Chrysomelidae found in Australia. These beetles are striped and small. The genus contains three species and was first described by Julius Weise in 1917. One species seen in Victoria is Rhaebosterna interruptofasciata was matched to a specimen in the Victorian museum. This was found on several occasions on tea tree.
