= Cyrtonus =

Scientific classification
- Domain: Eukaryota
- Kingdom: Animalia
- Phylum: Arthropoda
- Class: Insecta
- Order: Coleoptera
- Suborder: Polyphaga
- Infraorder: Cucujiformia
- Family: Chrysomelidae
- Subfamily: Chrysomelinae
- Genus: Cyrtonus; Latreille in Cuvier, 1829

Type species
- Chrysomela rotundata Herrich-Schäffer, 1838

Species
- See text

Synonyms
- Cyrlonussa E. Strand, 1935

Genus of beetles

Cyrtonus is a genus of leaf beetles in the subfamily Chrysomelinae.

== Species ==
The genus contains the following species:

- Cyrtonus almeriensis Cobos, 1953
- Cyrtonus angusticollis Fairmaire, 1851
- Cyrtonus arcasi Fairmaire, 1884
- Cyrtonus brevis Fairmaire, 1851
- Cyrtonus canalisternus Marseul, 1883
- Cyrtonus contractus Fairmaire, 1882
- Cyrtonus cupreovirens Perez Arcas, 1872
- Cyrtonus curtulus Fairmaire, 1883
- Cyrtonus curtus Fairmaire, 1851
- Cyrtonus cylindricus Marseul, 1883
- Cyrtonus dufouri Dufour, 1847
- Cyrtonus ehlersi Fairmaire, 1884
- Cyrtonus elegans (Germar, 1813)
- Cyrtonus eumolpus Fairmaire, 1851
- Cyrtonus fairmairei Rosenhauer, 1856
- Cyrtonus franzi Cobos, 1954
- Cyrtonus gadorensis Cobos, 1954
- Cyrtonus gibbicollis Fairmaire, 1866
- Cyrtonus heydeni Fairmaire, 1884
- Cyrtonus majoricensis Breit, 1908
- Cyrtonus martorellii Fairmaire, 1880
- Cyrtonus minor Fairmaire, 1883
- Cyrtonus montanus Fairmaire, 1851
- Cyrtonus oomorphus Fairmaire, 1882
- Cyrtonus plumbeus Fairmaire, 1851
- Cyrtonus puncticeps Fairmaire, 1882
- Cyrtonus punctipennis Fairmaire, 1857
- Cyrtonus punctulatus Fairmaire, 1883
- Cyrtonus riffensis Cobos, 1954
- Cyrtonus rotundatus (Herrich-Schäffer, 1838)
- Cyrtonus ruficornis Fairmaire, 1851
- Cyrtonus scutellatus Fairmaire, 1883
- Cyrtonus strictus Fairmaire, 1883
- Cyrtonus thoracicus Fairmaire, 1851
- Cyrtonus versicolor Marseul, 1883

The following species are considered to be nomina dubia:

- Cyrtonus denticulatus Chevrolat, 1872
- Cyrtonus dorsolineatus Fairmaire, 1883
- Cyrtonus mateui Cobos, 1954
- Cyrtonus pardoi Cobos, 1953
- Cyrtonus sycophanta Fairmaire, 1883
