= Aesernoides =

Scientific classification
- Domain: Eukaryota
- Kingdom: Animalia
- Phylum: Arthropoda
- Class: Insecta
- Order: Coleoptera
- Suborder: Polyphaga
- Infraorder: Cucujiformia
- Family: Chrysomelidae
- Subfamily: Chrysomelinae
- Genus: Aesernoides; Jacoby, 1885

Type species
- Aesernoides nigrofasciatus Jacoby, 1885

Genus of beetles

Aesernoides is a monotypic genus of leaf beetles indigenous to Australia. The sole species in the genus is Aesernoides nigrofasciatus. This species is found only in the rainforests of north-eastern New South Wales and south-eastern Queensland.

The genus was described by Martin Jacoby in 1885.
