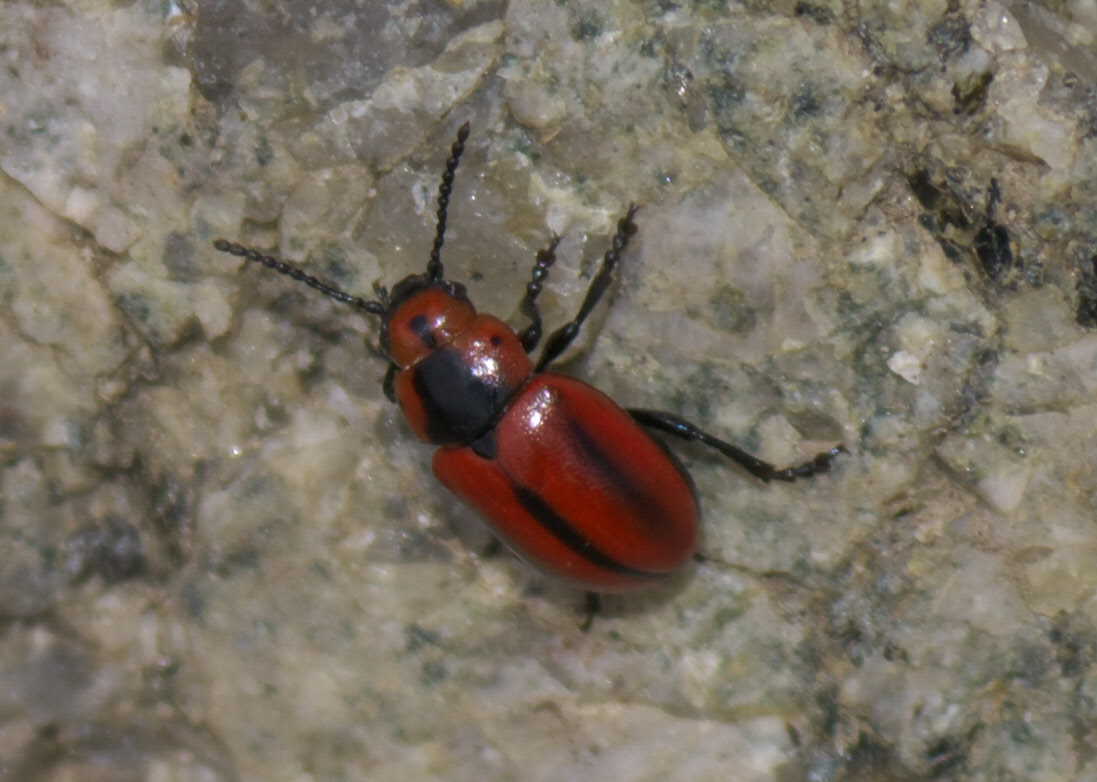
- Entomoscelis americana

Scientific classification
- Kingdom: Animalia
- Phylum: Arthropoda
- Clade: Pancrustacea
- Class: Insecta
- Order: Coleoptera
- Suborder: Polyphaga
- Infraorder: Cucujiformia
- Family: Chrysomelidae
- Tribe: Chrysomelini
- Genus: Entomoscelis; Chevrolat in Dejean, 1836

Type species
- Chrysomela adonidis Pallas, 1771

= Entomoscelis =

Genus of beetles

Entomoscelis is a genus of leaf beetles in the family Chrysomelidae. There are about 12 described species in Entomoscelis. The genus has a Holarctic distribution. Adults have red elytra with black markings.

== Species ==
These 12 species belong to the genus Entomoscelis:

- Entomoscelis adonidis (Pallas, 1771)
  - Entomoscelis adonidis adonidis (Pallas, 1771) – Distribution: from Portugal to Russian Far East and the north-western part of North America (western Canada and western USA); includes the former Entomoscelis americana
  - Entomoscelis adonidis caucasica Kippenberg, 2020 – Distribution: Armenia, Georgia, Iran, Russia, Turkey
  - Entomoscelis adonidis goliath Abeille de Perrin, 1897 – Distribution: Southeastern Turkey
- Entomoscelis berytensis (Reiche & Saulcy, 1858) – Distribution: Armenia, Turkey, Syria, Lebanon, Israel, Jordan, Iraq, Iran, Egypt (?)
- Entomoscelis cornea Abeille de Perrin, 1897 – Distribution: North Africa, from Morocco to Libya
- Entomoscelis deserticola Lopatin, 1967 – Distribution: China
- Entomoscelis dorsalis (Fabricius, 1777)
  - Entomoscelis dorsalis bashkiriae Kippenberg, 2020 – Distribution: Russia (Bashkortostan)
  - Entomoscelis dorsalis dorsalis (Fabricius, 1777) – Distribution: Austria, Slovakia, Hungary, Greece (?)
  - Entomoscelis dorsalis hammarstroemi Jacobson, 1901 – Distribution: Russia (southern Siberia)
  - Entomoscelis dorsalis iranica Kippenberg, 2020 – Distribution: Northern Iran (Tehran Province)
  - Entomoscelis dorsalis turkestana Mikhailov, 2020 – Distribution: Kazakhstan
- Entomoscelis erythrocnema Jacobson, 1893 – Distribution: Uzbekistan, Tajikistan, northern Afghanistan
- Entomoscelis nigriventris Daccordi & Yang, 2009 – Distribution: China
- Entomoscelis orientalis Motschulsky, 1860 – Distribution: China
- Entomoscelis pilula Lopatin, 1967 – Distribution: Caucasus and Central Asia
- Entomoscelis pulla Daccordi & Ge, 2009 – Distribution: China
- Entomoscelis rumex Kippenberg, 2020 (replacement name for Entomoscelis rumicis (Fabricius, 1787)) – Distribution: North Africa (Maghreb), Spain (?)
- Entomoscelis sacra (Linnaeus, 1758) – Distribution: Romania, Moldova, North Macedonia, Bulgaria, Greece, Ukraine, Crimea, Russia (Udmurtia), Georgia, Armenia, Turkey, Syria, Israel, Jordan, Iraq, Iran

Formerly included species:

- Entomoscelis americana Brown, 1942 (red turnip beetle): synonym of Entomoscelis adonidis (Pallas, 1771)
- Entomoscelis occidentalis Escalera, 1914: synonym of Entomoscelis cornea Abeille de Perrin, 1897
- Entomoscelis suturalis Weise, 1882: synonym of Entomoscelis sacra (Linnaeus, 1758)

The name Entomoscelis melanostoma (Gmelin, 1790) is considered a nomen dubium.
