= Alfius (beetle) =

Scientific classification
- Domain: Eukaryota
- Kingdom: Animalia
- Phylum: Arthropoda
- Class: Insecta
- Order: Coleoptera
- Suborder: Polyphaga
- Infraorder: Cucujiformia
- Family: Chrysomelidae
- Subfamily: Chrysomelinae
- Genus: Alfius; Reid, 2006

Type species
- Oomela pictipennis Lea, 1929

Genus of beetles

Alfius is a genus of Chrysomelinae (leaf beetles) endemic to Queensland, Australia.

== Species ==
Three species are included in the genus:

- Alfius hieroglyphicus (Lea, 1929)
- Alfius pictus (Lea, 1929)
- Alfius pictipennis (Lea, 1929)
