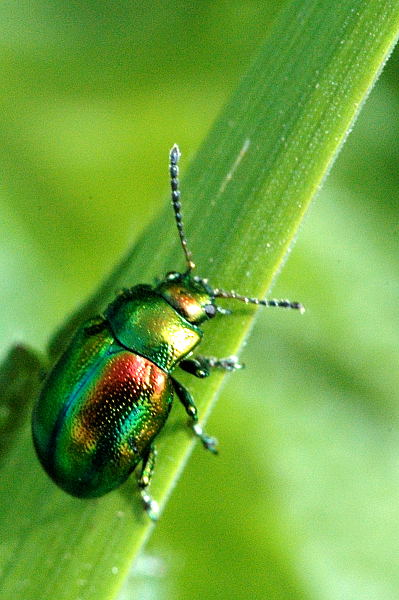
- Fasta fastuosa

Scientific classification
- Kingdom: Animalia
- Phylum: Arthropoda
- Clade: Pancrustacea
- Class: Insecta
- Order: Coleoptera
- Suborder: Polyphaga
- Infraorder: Cucujiformia
- Family: Chrysomelidae
- Subfamily: Chrysomelinae; Latreille, 1802

Tribes
- Chrysomelini; Timarchini; †Mesolpinini

= Chrysomelinae =

Chrysomelinae Temporal range: Aptian–Recent

Subfamily of beetles

The Chrysomelinae are a subfamily of leaf beetles (Chrysomelidae), commonly known as broad-bodied leaf beetles or broad-shouldered leaf beetles. It includes some 3,000 species around the world.

The best-known member is the notorious Colorado potato beetle (Leptinotarsa decemlineata), an important agricultural pest.

== Description ==
Adults of Chrysomelinae are beetles with the following features: antennae inserted on or adjacent to anterior edge of head; inner face of each mandible with large membranous prostheca; each wing with only one anal cell (sometimes the wings are reduced or absent); metendosternite lateral arms without lobes; femora without internal spring sclerite; tibial spurs absent; tarsi without bifid setae; stridulatory mechanism absent; male aedeagus without tegminal ring and the testes not fused within a common membrane; female kotpresse absent. In terms of general appearance, the body is convex, round or oval, and often brightly coloured. The colours and patterns may vary even within a species. Flightless species (at least in the Australian chrysomeline fauna) tend to be small and dark, and also nocturnal.

Larvae can be recognised by: 6 pairs of stemmata on the head; labial palpi 2-segmented; mandibles palmate; labrum freely articulated; annular spiracles; legs present, with paronychial appendix and pretarsus; not in a transportable case.

Both adults and larvae have glands that secrete chemicals to defend against predators.

== Diet ==
Chrysomelinae are herbivorous and usually feed on plant leaves, less commonly on flowers. There is geographic variation: chrysomelines in the temperate northern hemisphere mostly feed on annual or perennial herbs, whereas the temperate southern hemisphere chrysomelines prefer woody shrubs and trees.

Larval cannibalism is known from some Chrysomelinae.

== Life cycle ==
The general life cycle of Chrysomelinae begins with eggs laid on a host plant. These hatch into larvae which feed on the plant. When fully developed, larvae go down to the soil to pupate. Adults emerge and feed on host plants again, and also reproduce. There are variations on this cycle, such as ovoviviparity (larvae emerging from eggs as they are laid) or viviparity (giving birth to larvae), eggs being dropped from host plants, or pupation occurring on host plants (Plagiodera).

== Behaviour ==
Larvae of various species form groups, possibly as defense against predators and parasitoids, while other species have solitary larvae. Adults of Zygogramma appendiculata have also been observed aggregating.

Larvae of some Platyphora attach trichomes from their host plant to hairs on their back, possibly to camouflage themselves.

Feigning death occurs in adults and larvae of various species.

Some species of Chrysomelinae express high levels of maternal care by insect standards. Not only do they locate food-rich environments for their eggs, they protect both the eggs and the larvae after hatching.

== Evolutionary history ==
The oldest members of the family are several species of the genus Mesolpinus, belonging to the extinct monotypic tribe Mesolpinini, known from the Aptian aged Yixian Formation of China.

== Selected genera ==
The subfamily includes the following genera:

- Agasta
- Aesernoides
- Alfius
- Callidemum
- Calligrapha
- Calomela
- Cecchiniola
- Chalcolampra
- Chalcomela
- Chrysomela
- Chrysolina
- Colaphellus
- Colaspidema
- Crosita
- Cyrtonastes
- Cyrtonus
- Dicranosterna
- Doryphora
- Entomoscelis
- Fasta
- Gastrophysa
- Geomela
- Gonioctena (includes Phytodecta)
- Hydrothassa
- Labidomera
- Lamprolina
- Leptinotarsa
- Linaedea
- Machomena
- Microtheca
- Oomela
- Oreina
- †Paleophaedon
- Paropsides
- Paropsis
- Paropsisterna
- Peltoschema
- Phaedon
- Phratora
- Phola
- Plagiodera
- Prasocuris
- Promechus
- Proseicela
- Rhaebosterna
- Sclerophaedon
- †Stenaspidiotus
- Timarcha
- Timarchida
- Trachymela
- Zira

== Gallery ==
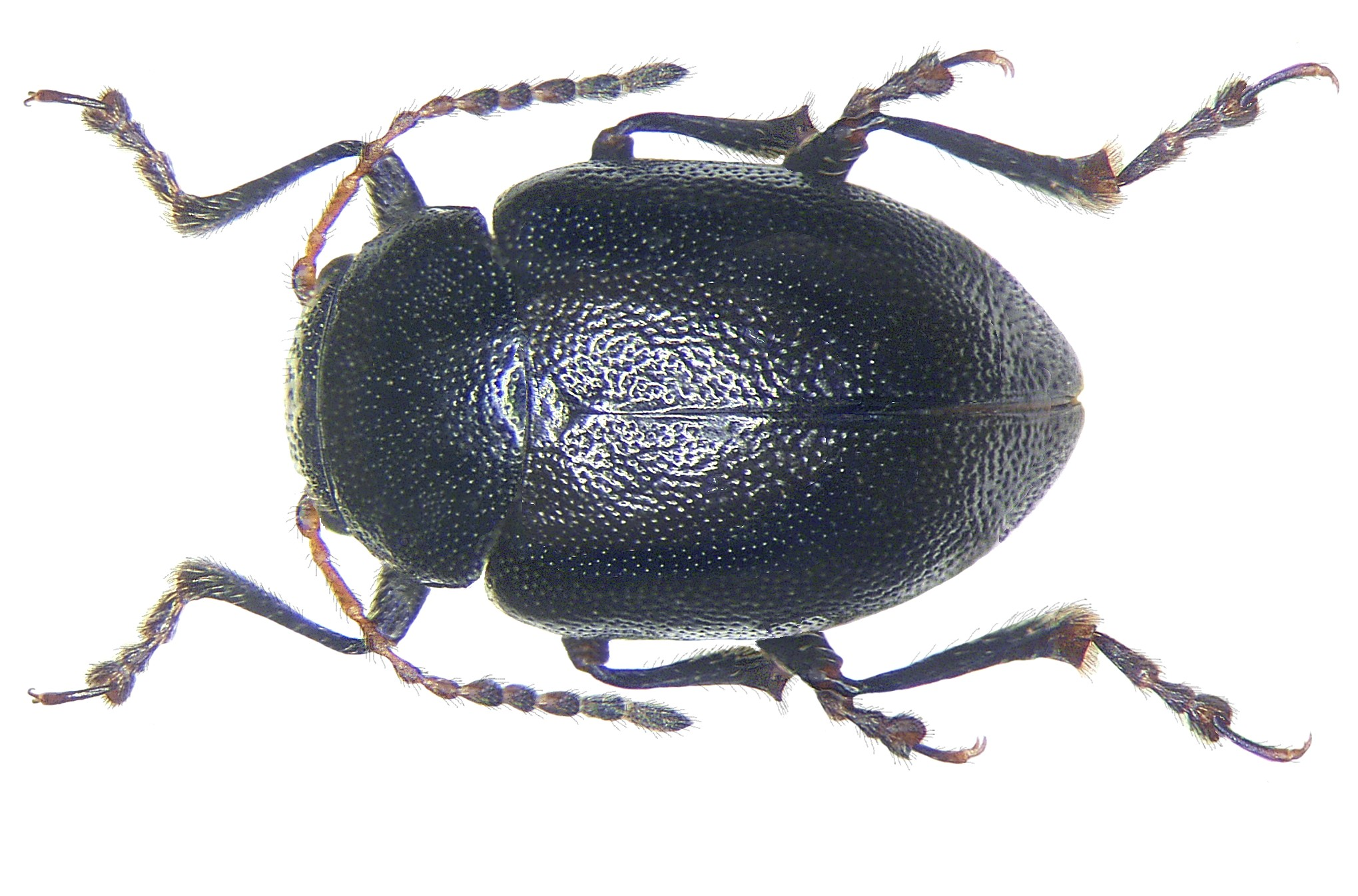
Colaspidema barbarum

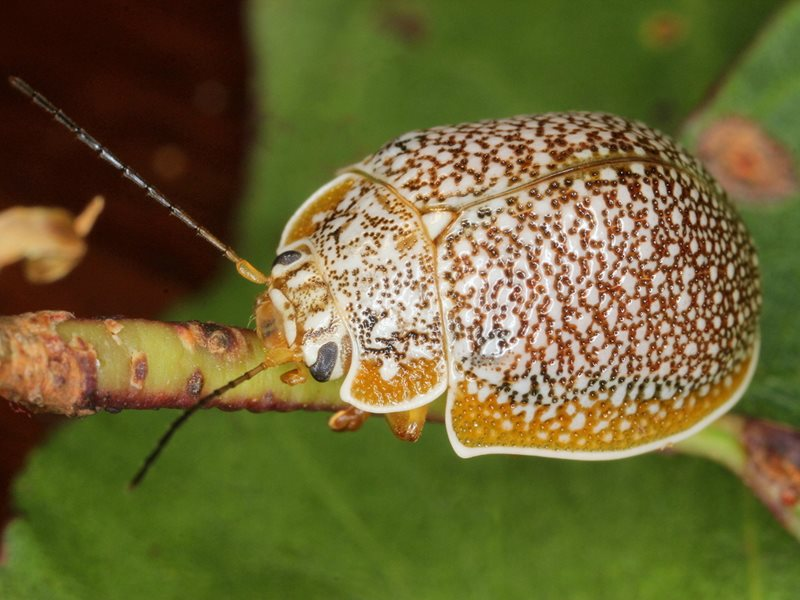
Paropsis dilatata

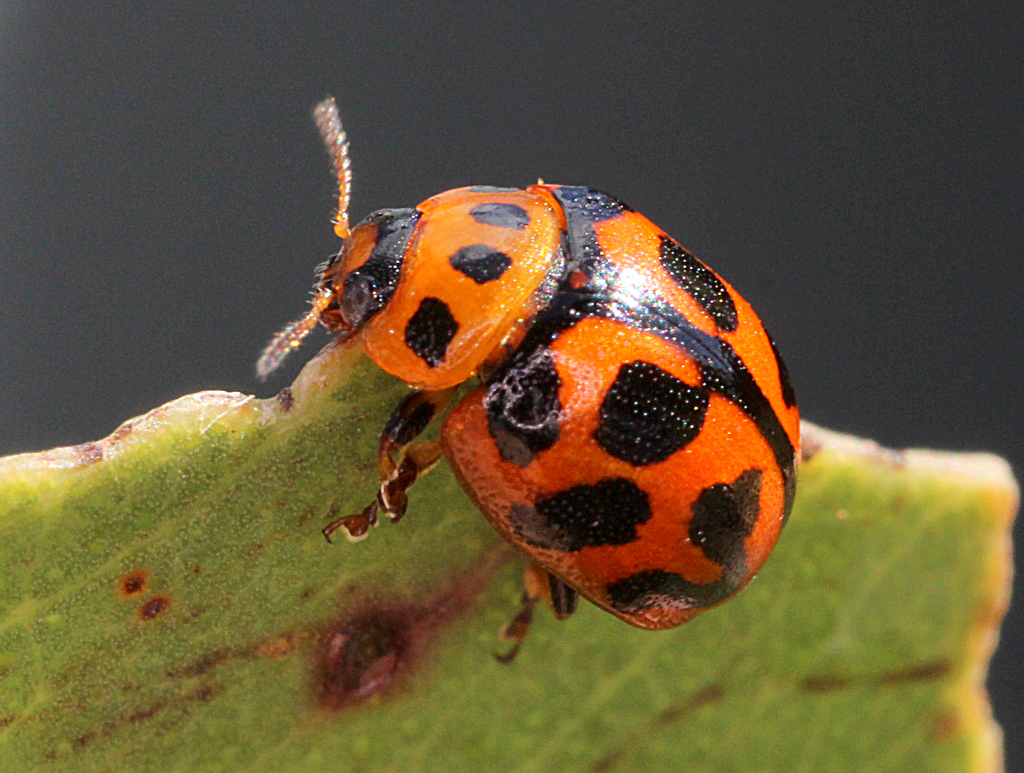
Peltoschema oceanica

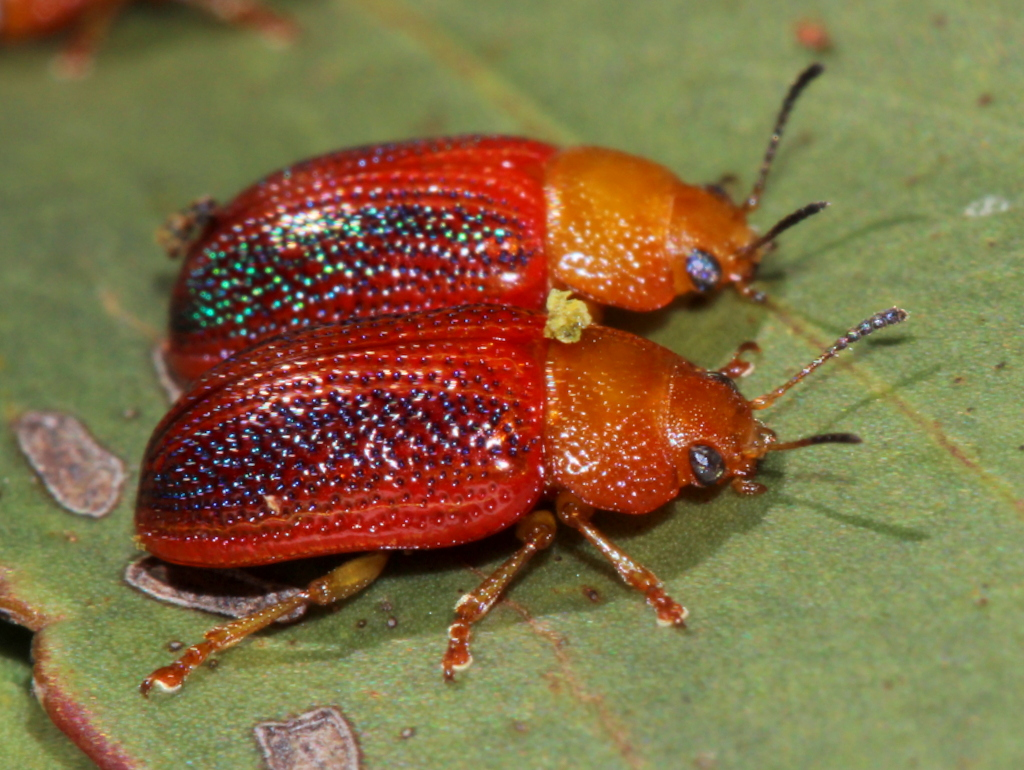
Calomela satelles

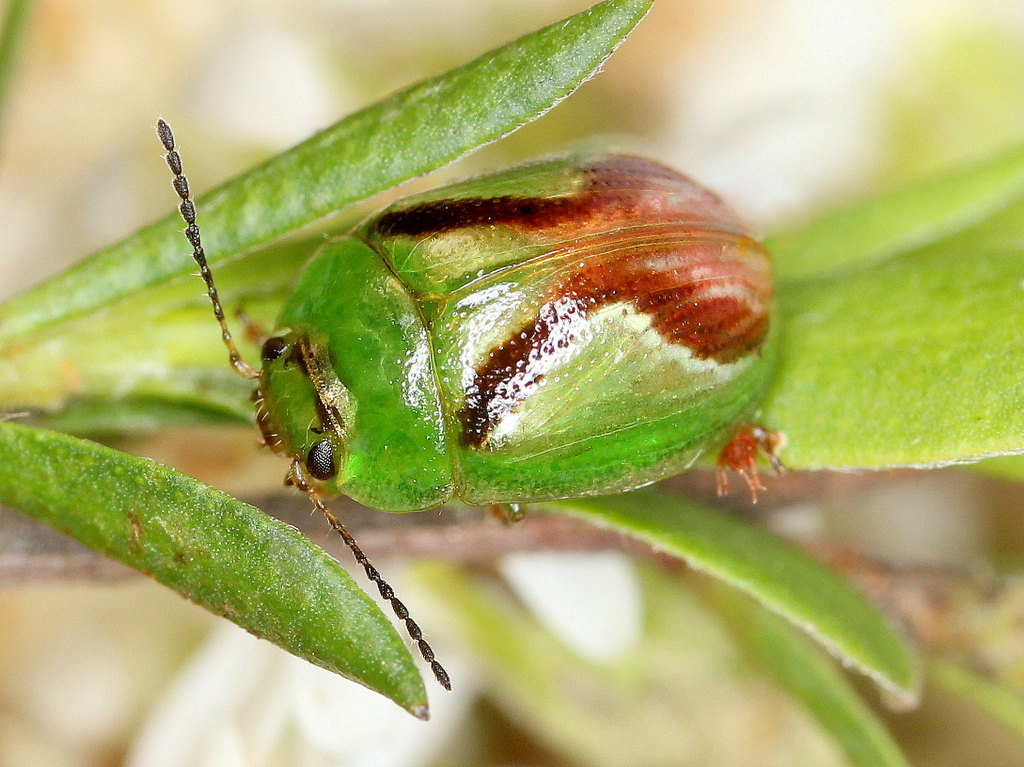
Paropsides opposita

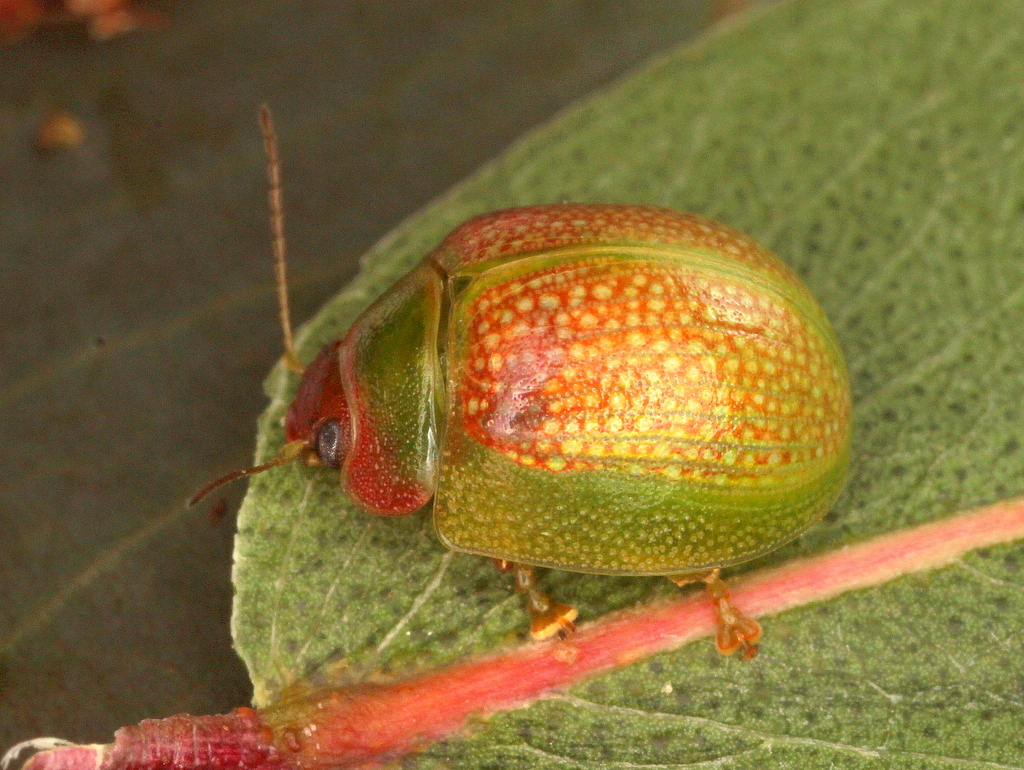
Paropsisterna

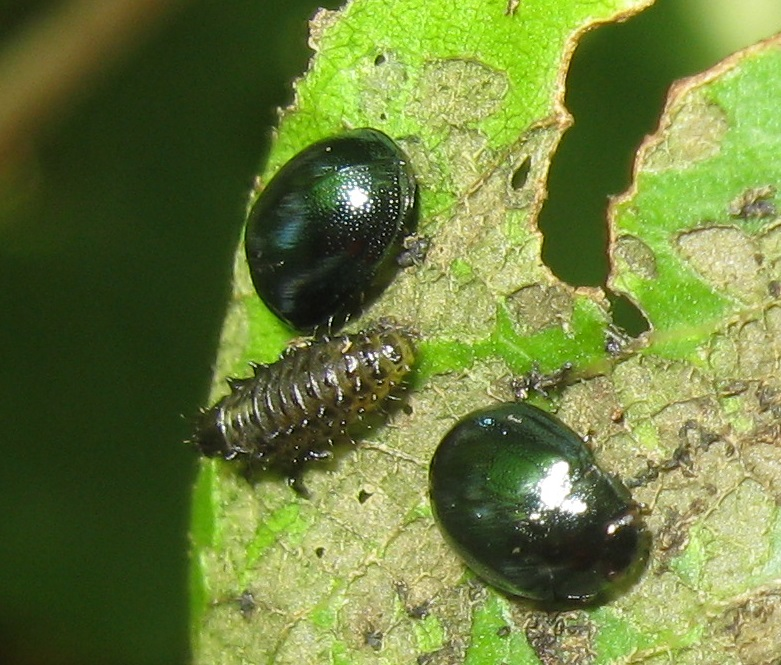
Plagiodera versicolora, larva and adults

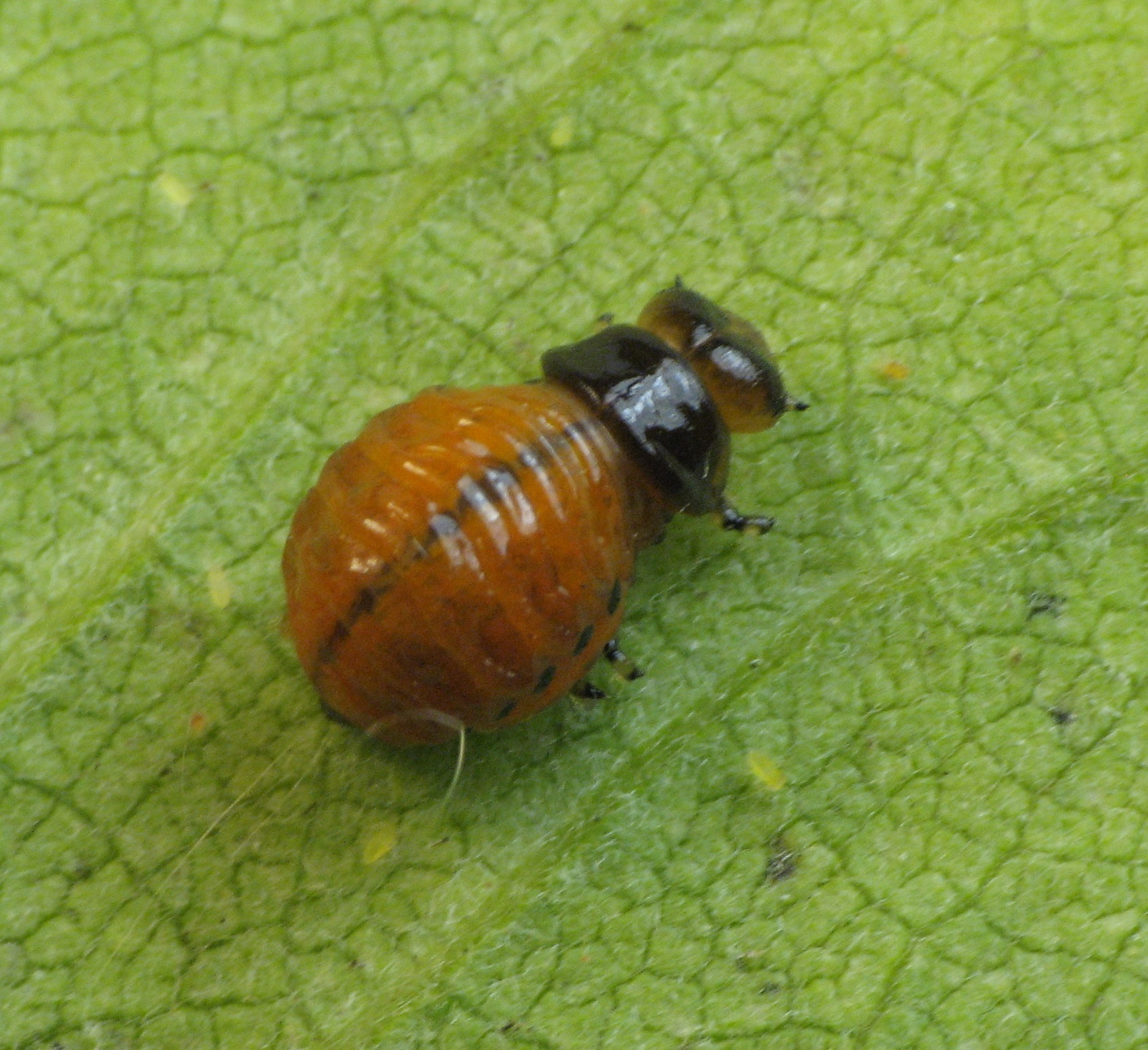
Labidomera clivicollis, larva
