= Phyllophila =

Scientific classification
- Kingdom: Animalia
- Phylum: Arthropoda
- Class: Insecta
- Order: Lepidoptera
- Superfamily: Noctuoidea
- Family: Noctuidae
- Subfamily: Acontiinae
- Tribe: Acontiini
- Genus: Phyllophila; Guenée in Boisduval & Guenée, 1852

Genus of moths

Phyllophila is a genus of moths of the family Noctuidae. The genus was erected by Achille Guenée in 1852.

== Species ==
- Phyllophila atripars Hampson, 1914
- Phyllophila atrisigna Dognin, 1914
- Phyllophila cogela Schaus, 1904
- Phyllophila corgatha Berio, 1984
- Phyllophila flavitermina Hampson, 1902
- Phyllophila griseola Felder & Rogenhofer, 1874
- Phyllophila melacheila Staudinger, 1895
- Phyllophila obliterata Rambur, 1833
- Phyllophila obscura Hampson, 1894
- Phyllophila richinii Berio, 1940
- Phyllophila rufescens Hampson, 1910
- Phyllophila torrefacta Distant, 1898
- Phyllophila yangtsea Draudt, 1950
