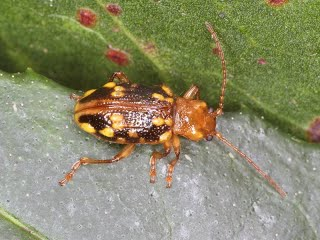
- Chalcolampra pustulata

Scientific classification
- Kingdom: Animalia
- Phylum: Arthropoda
- Class: Insecta
- Order: Coleoptera
- Suborder: Polyphaga
- Infraorder: Cucujiformia
- Family: Chrysomelidae
- Subfamily: Chrysomelinae
- Genus: Chalcolampra; Blanchard, 1853

Type species
- Chalcolampra convexa Blanchard, 1853

Species
- >30

Synonyms
- Allocharis Sharp, 1882; Cyrtonogetus Broun, 1915; Eualema Broun, 1903

= Chalcolampra =

Genus of beetles

Chalcolampra is a genus of leaf beetles (insects contained in the family Chrysomelidae). These beetles are widespread from Southeast Asia to Australia and New Zealand, but most common in the southeast of Australia. There are approximately 25 Australian species within this genus. There are also 13 species described from New Zealand, with up to an additional 20 undescribed species from the South Island.

== Species ==
The genus contains the following species:

- Chalcolampra adelioides Lea, 1903
- Chalcolampra aenea (Boisduval, 1835)
- Chalcolampra chalybeata Baly, 1855
- Chalcolampra consimilis Lea, 1903
- Chalcolampra constricta (Erichson, 1842)
- Chalcolampra crassa (Broun, 1915)
- Chalcolampra distinguenda Blackburn, 1889
- Chalcolampra fulvomontis Reid, 1993
- Chalcolampra fuscipes (Broun, 1917)
- Chalcolampra laticollis Clark, 1865
- Chalcolampra limbata (Broun, 1893)
- Chalcolampra longicornis Lea, 1929
- Chalcolampra marginata (Sharp, 1882)
- Chalcolampra marmorata Baly, 1865
- Chalcolampra media (Broun, 1917)
- Chalcolampra morosa (Broun, 1893)
- Chalcolampra multinoda Reid, 1993
- Chalcolampra nigricollis (Broun, 1917)
- Chalcolampra pacifica (Erichson, 1842)
- Chalcolampra pallida Weise, 1923
- Chalcolampra picticornis Broun, 1917
- Chalcolampra praestans (Broun, 1917)
- Chalcolampra pustulata Baly, 1855
- Chalcolampra repens (Germar, 1848)
- Chalcolampra robusta (Broun, 1917)
- Chalcolampra rufinoda Lea, 1904
- Chalcolampra rufipes Jacoby, 1885
- Chalcolampra rustica Blackburn, 1890
- Chalcolampra speculifera Sharp, 1882
- Chalcolampra subsulcata (Broun, 1917)
- Chalcolampra tarsalis (Broun, 1917)
- Chalcolampra thoracica Baly, 1855
- Chalcolampra walgalu Reid, 1993
- Chalcolampra winnunga (Daccordi, 2003)
