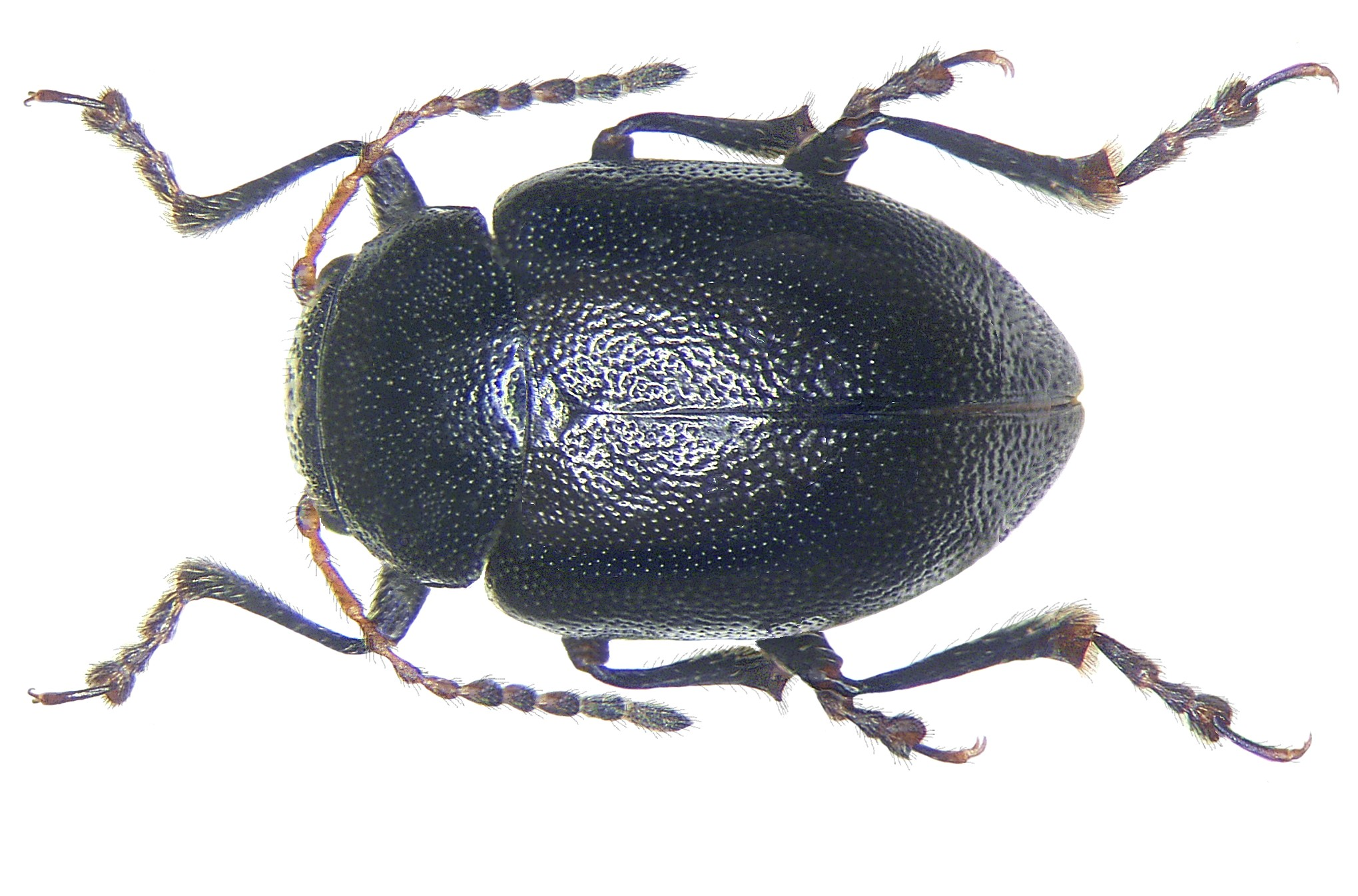
- Colaspidema barbarum
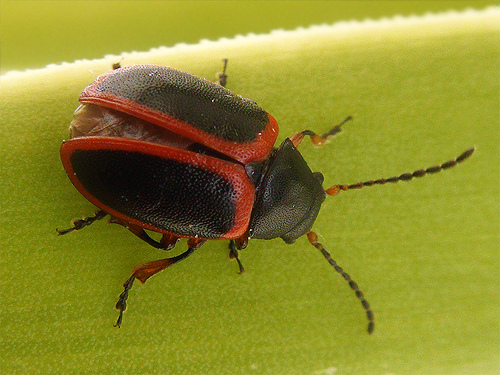
- Colaspidema dufouri

Scientific classification
- Domain: Eukaryota
- Kingdom: Animalia
- Phylum: Arthropoda
- Class: Insecta
- Order: Coleoptera
- Suborder: Polyphaga
- Infraorder: Cucujiformia
- Family: Chrysomelidae
- Subfamily: Chrysomelinae
- Genus: Colaspidema; Laporte, 1833

Type species
- Chrysomela atra (= Chrysomela barbara Fabricius, 1792) Olivier, 1790

Synonyms
- Colaphus Dejean, 1836

= Colaspidema =

Genus of leaf beetles

Colaspidema is a genus of leaf beetles in the subfamily Chrysomelinae.

== Species ==
The genus contains the following species, in two subgenera:

- Subgenus Colaphomega Reitter, 1913 (Type species: Chrysomela rufifrons Olivier, 1807)
  - Colaspidema dufouri (Perez Arcas, 1865)
  - Colaspidema rufifrons (Olivier, 1807)
  - Colaspidema signatipenne Guérin-Ménéville, 1844
- Subgenus Colaspidema Laporte, 1833 (Type species: Chrysomela atra Olivier, 1790 (= Chrysomela barbara Fabricius, 1792))
  - Colaspidema barbarum (Fabricius, 1792)
