= Alurnus grossus =

Scientific classification
- Kingdom: Animalia
- Phylum: Arthropoda
- Clade: Pancrustacea
- Class: Insecta
- Order: Coleoptera
- Suborder: Polyphaga
- Infraorder: Cucujiformia
- Family: Chrysomelidae
- Genus: Alurnus
- Species: A. grossus

Binomial name
- Alurnus grossus Fabricius, 1775

Synonyms
- Cistela curvipes Panzer, 1798; Crioceris indica Voet, 1806; Alurnus tricolor Olivier, 1789; Alurnus grossus nigricans Jacobson, 1899

Species of beetle

Alurnus grossus is a species of beetle of the family Chrysomelidae. It is found in Brazil, Ecuador, French Guiana, Peru and Suriname.

== Description ==
Adults reach a length of about 22–33 mm. Adults have a black head and legs, while the pronotum is red with a black anterior margin. The elytron is yellow.
