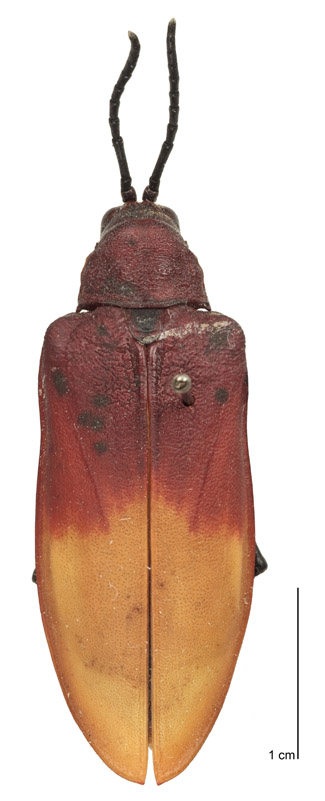

Scientific classification
- Kingdom: Animalia
- Phylum: Arthropoda
- Clade: Pancrustacea
- Class: Insecta
- Order: Coleoptera
- Suborder: Polyphaga
- Infraorder: Cucujiformia
- Family: Chrysomelidae
- Genus: Alurnus
- Species: A. bicolor

Binomial name
- Alurnus bicolor Staines, 2013

= Alurnus bicolor =

Species of beetle

Alurnus bicolor is a species of beetle of the family Chrysomelidae. It is found in Colombia and Panama.

== Description ==
Adults reach a length of about 37 mm. Adults have a black head and legs, while the pronotum is red. The basal part of the elytron is red, while the apical area is yellowish. There are three to five black spots.

== Biology ==
They have been recorded feeding on Chamaedorea species.
