= Alurnus mutabilis =

Scientific classification
- Kingdom: Animalia
- Phylum: Arthropoda
- Clade: Pancrustacea
- Class: Insecta
- Order: Coleoptera
- Suborder: Polyphaga
- Infraorder: Cucujiformia
- Family: Chrysomelidae
- Genus: Alurnus
- Species: A. mutabilis

Binomial name
- Alurnus mutabilis Waterhouse, 1881

Synonyms
- Alurnus mutabilis confluens Jacobson, 1899

Species of beetle

Alurnus mutabilis is a species of beetle of the family Chrysomelidae. It is found in Ecuador.

== Description ==
Adults reach a length of about 20–24 mm. Adults have a black head and legs, while the pronotum is yellow with a black area. The elytron is yellow with a black apical margin and black spots.
