= Alurnus batesii =

Scientific classification
- Kingdom: Animalia
- Phylum: Arthropoda
- Clade: Pancrustacea
- Class: Insecta
- Order: Coleoptera
- Suborder: Polyphaga
- Infraorder: Cucujiformia
- Family: Chrysomelidae
- Genus: Alurnus
- Species: A. batesii

Binomial name
- Alurnus batesii Baly, 1864

Synonyms
- Alurnus batesi triangularis Jacobson, 1899

Species of beetle

Alurnus batesii is a species of beetle of the family Chrysomelidae. It is found in Brazil (Amazonas), Ecuador and Peru.

== Description ==
Adults reach a length of about 22–25 mm. Adults have a black head and legs, while the pronotum is red. The elytron is yellow with three black spots.
