= Alurnus boucardi =

Scientific classification
- Kingdom: Animalia
- Phylum: Arthropoda
- Clade: Pancrustacea
- Class: Insecta
- Order: Coleoptera
- Suborder: Polyphaga
- Infraorder: Cucujiformia
- Family: Chrysomelidae
- Genus: Alurnus
- Species: A. boucardi

Binomial name
- Alurnus boucardi Rosenberg, 1898

Species of beetle

Alurnus boucardi is a species of beetle of the family Chrysomelidae. It is found in Colombia and Panama.

== Description ==
Adults reach a length of about 30–33 mm. Adults have a black head and legs. The elytron is yellow with two black spots.
