= Alurnus sexguttatus =

Scientific classification
- Kingdom: Animalia
- Phylum: Arthropoda
- Clade: Pancrustacea
- Class: Insecta
- Order: Coleoptera
- Suborder: Polyphaga
- Infraorder: Cucujiformia
- Family: Chrysomelidae
- Genus: Alurnus
- Species: A. sexguttatus

Binomial name
- Alurnus sexguttatus Rosenberg, 1898

Species of beetle

Alurnus sexguttatus is a species of beetle of the family Chrysomelidae. It is found in Ecuador.

== Description ==
Adults reach a length of about 16 mm. Adults have a shiny greenish-black head, pronotum and legs, while the elytron is pale yellow with black lateral and apical margins and three small black spots.
