= Alurnus dallieri =

Scientific classification
- Kingdom: Animalia
- Phylum: Arthropoda
- Clade: Pancrustacea
- Class: Insecta
- Order: Coleoptera
- Suborder: Polyphaga
- Infraorder: Cucujiformia
- Family: Chrysomelidae
- Genus: Alurnus
- Species: A. dallieri

Binomial name
- Alurnus dallieri Pic, 1926

Synonyms
- Alurnus costalis dallieri Pic, 1926; Alurnus tricolor Uhmann, 1927 (preocc.); Alurnus horni Uhmann, 1935

Species of beetle

Alurnus dallieri is a species of beetle of the family Chrysomelidae. It is found in Ecuador.

== Description ==
Adults reach a length of about 24–30 mm. Adults have a black head, pronotum and legs, while the elytron is yellow with a large blue-red spot.
