= Alurnus undatus =

Scientific classification
- Kingdom: Animalia
- Phylum: Arthropoda
- Clade: Pancrustacea
- Class: Insecta
- Order: Coleoptera
- Suborder: Polyphaga
- Infraorder: Cucujiformia
- Family: Chrysomelidae
- Genus: Alurnus
- Species: A. undatus

Binomial name
- Alurnus undatus Brême, 1844

Species of beetle

Alurnus undatus is a species of beetle of the family Chrysomelidae. It is found in Colombia and Panama.

== Description ==
Adults reach a length of about 17–25 mm. Adults have a black head, pronotum and legs, while the elytron is yellow with three black transverse bands.
