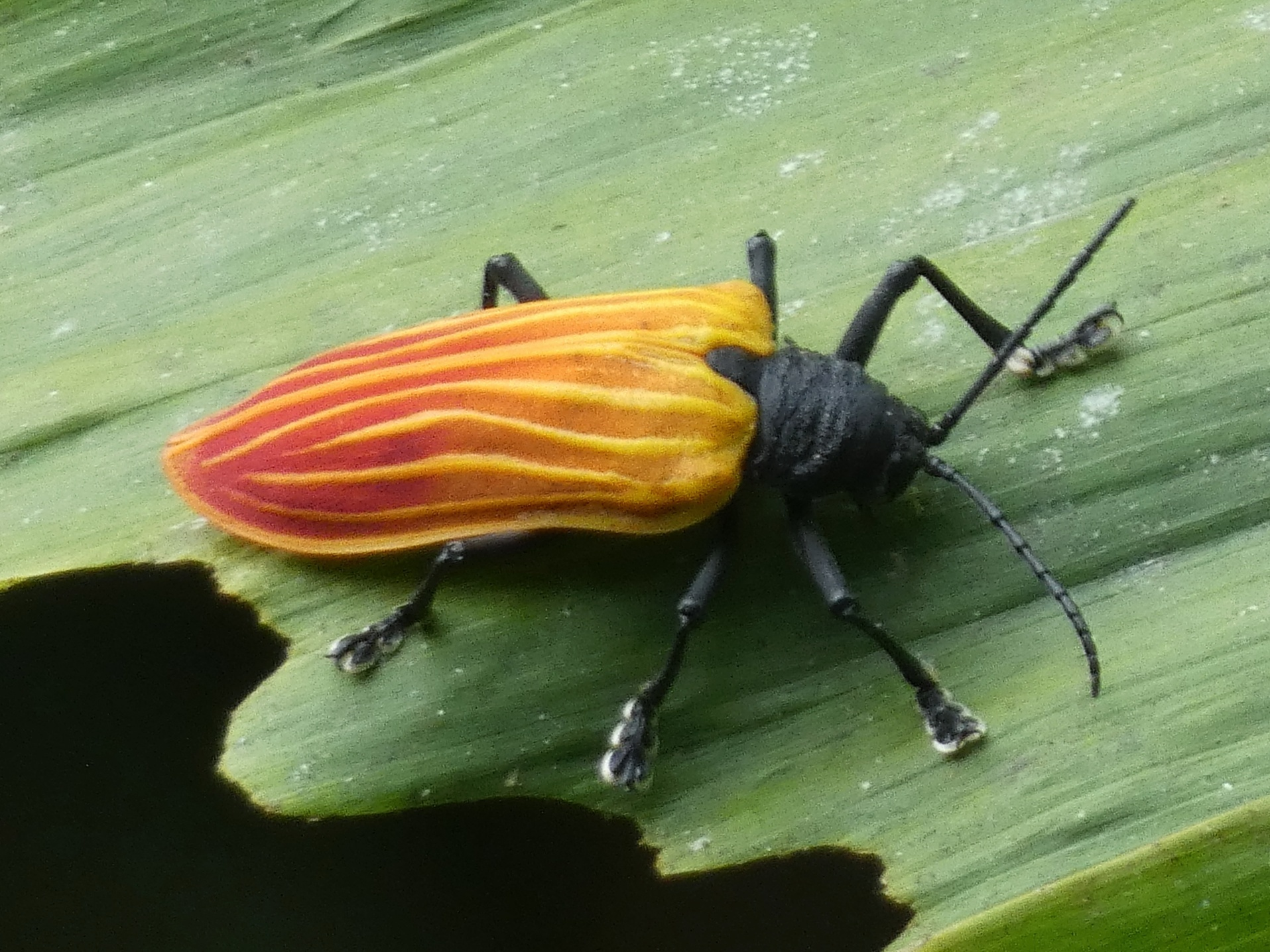

Scientific classification
- Kingdom: Animalia
- Phylum: Arthropoda
- Clade: Pancrustacea
- Class: Insecta
- Order: Coleoptera
- Suborder: Polyphaga
- Infraorder: Cucujiformia
- Family: Chrysomelidae
- Genus: Alurnus
- Species: A. costalis

Binomial name
- Alurnus costalis Rosenberg, 1898

Synonyms
- Alurnus costalis bipartita Pic, 1926; Alurnus costalis niger Pic, 1926

= Alurnus costalis =

Species of beetle

Alurnus costalis is a species of beetle of the family Chrysomelidae. It is found in Colombia and Ecuador.

== Description ==
Adults reach a length of about 33 mm. Adults have a black head, pronotum and legs. The basal area of the elytron is yellowish-brown, while the apical area is dark red.
