= Alurnus lansbergei =

Scientific classification
- Kingdom: Animalia
- Phylum: Arthropoda
- Clade: Pancrustacea
- Class: Insecta
- Order: Coleoptera
- Suborder: Polyphaga
- Infraorder: Cucujiformia
- Family: Chrysomelidae
- Genus: Alurnus
- Species: A. lansbergei

Binomial name
- Alurnus lansbergei Sallé, 1849

Synonyms
- Alurnus lansbergei juncta Pic, 1934

Species of beetle

Alurnus lansbergei is a species of beetle of the family Chrysomelidae. It is found in Brazil, Colombia and Venezuela.

== Description ==
Adults reach a length of about 20–24 mm. Adults have a bluish-black head and legs, while the pronotum is reddish with black apical and basal margins. The elytron is yellow with four black markings.
