= Arima brachyptera =

Scientific classification
- Kingdom: Animalia
- Phylum: Arthropoda
- Clade: Pancrustacea
- Class: Insecta
- Order: Coleoptera
- Suborder: Polyphaga
- Infraorder: Cucujiformia
- Family: Chrysomelidae
- Subfamily: Galerucinae
- Genus: Arima
- Species: A. brachyptera

Binomial name
- Arima brachyptera (Küster, 1844)

Species of beetle

Arima brachyptera is a species of leaf beetle in the genus Arima. Sexual dwarphism is present in the species.
