= Alurnus eckardtae =

Scientific classification
- Kingdom: Animalia
- Phylum: Arthropoda
- Clade: Pancrustacea
- Class: Insecta
- Order: Coleoptera
- Suborder: Polyphaga
- Infraorder: Cucujiformia
- Family: Chrysomelidae
- Genus: Alurnus
- Species: A. eckardtae

Binomial name
- Alurnus eckardtae Günther, 1936

Species of beetle

Alurnus eckardtae is a species of beetle of the family Chrysomelidae. It is found in Brazil (São Paulo) and Peru.

== Description ==
Adults reach a length of about 19–24 mm. Adults have a black head, pronotum and legs, while the elytron is brick-red with two black transverse bands and black lateral and apical margins.
