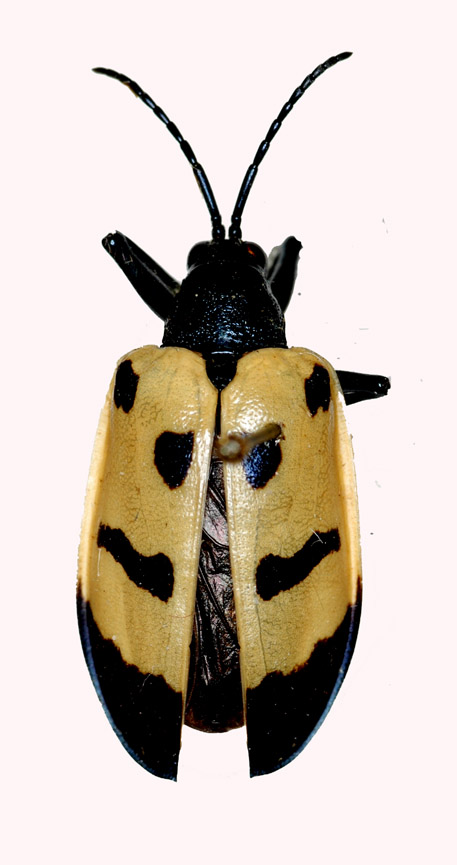

Scientific classification
- Kingdom: Animalia
- Phylum: Arthropoda
- Clade: Pancrustacea
- Class: Insecta
- Order: Coleoptera
- Suborder: Polyphaga
- Infraorder: Cucujiformia
- Family: Chrysomelidae
- Genus: Alurnus
- Species: A. salvini

Binomial name
- Alurnus salvini Guérin-Méneville, 1840

Synonyms
- Alurnus salvini fallax Jacobson, 1899; Alurnus salvini panamensis Pic, 1922

= Alurnus salvini =

Species of beetle

Alurnus salvini is a species of beetle of the family Chrysomelidae. It is found in Colombia, Costa Rica, Panama and Venezuela.

== Description ==
Adults reach a length of about 15.7-25 mm. Adults have a black head, pronotum and legs, while the elytron has three large black spots.

== Biology ==
They have been recorded feeding on Chamaedorea species and Bactris gasaeipes.
