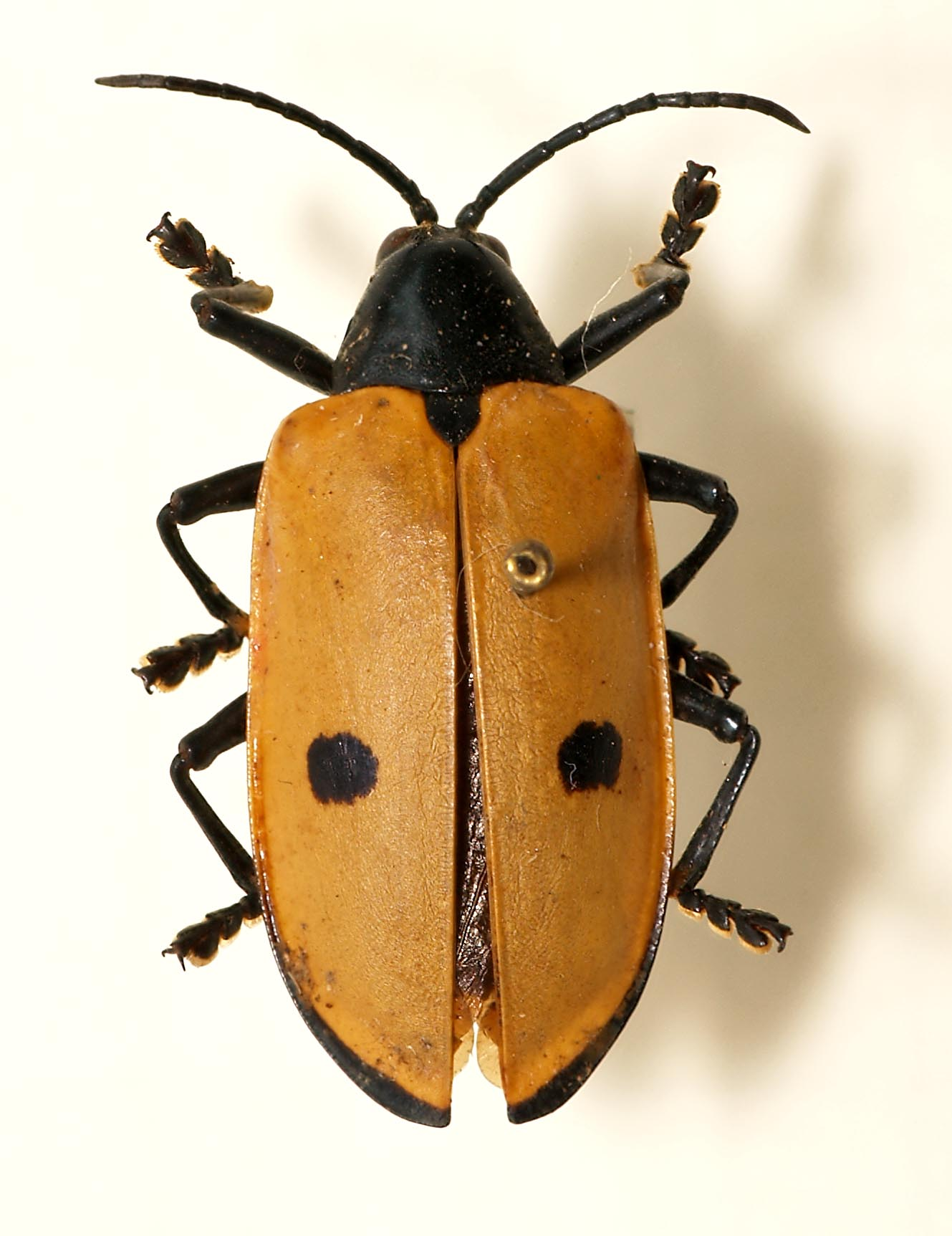

Scientific classification
- Kingdom: Animalia
- Phylum: Arthropoda
- Clade: Pancrustacea
- Class: Insecta
- Order: Coleoptera
- Suborder: Polyphaga
- Infraorder: Cucujiformia
- Family: Chrysomelidae
- Genus: Alurnus
- Species: A. bipunctatus

Binomial name
- Alurnus bipunctatus (Olivier, 1792)

Synonyms
- Hispa bipunctatus Olivier, 1792; Alurnus apicalis Guérin-Méneville, 1840; Alurnus bipunctatus deficiens Jacobson, 1899; Alurnus cupido Thomson, 1856; Alurnus bipunctatus olivieri Jacobson, 1899; Alurnus apicalis guerini Jacobson, 1899

= Alurnus bipunctatus =

Species of beetle

Alurnus bipunctatus is a species of beetle of the family Chrysomelidae. It is found in Bolivia, Brazil, Colombia, French Guiana, Guyana, Peru, Suriname and Venezuela.

== Description ==
Adults reach a length of about 20.5-31 mm. Adults have a black head and legs. The elytron is yellow with a black apical margin and two black spots.
