= Alurnus crenatus =

Scientific classification
- Kingdom: Animalia
- Phylum: Arthropoda
- Clade: Pancrustacea
- Class: Insecta
- Order: Coleoptera
- Suborder: Polyphaga
- Infraorder: Cucujiformia
- Family: Chrysomelidae
- Genus: Alurnus
- Species: A. crenatus

Binomial name
- Alurnus crenatus Staines, 2013

Species of beetle

Alurnus crenatus is a species of beetle of the family Chrysomelidae. It is found in Bolivia.

== Description ==
Adults reach a length of about 22 mm. Adults have a metallic blue-green head, pronotum and legs. The elytron is yellowish with two metallic blue-green spots and a metallic blue-green apical one-third.
