= Alurnus chapuisi =

Scientific classification
- Kingdom: Animalia
- Phylum: Arthropoda
- Clade: Pancrustacea
- Class: Insecta
- Order: Coleoptera
- Suborder: Polyphaga
- Infraorder: Cucujiformia
- Family: Chrysomelidae
- Genus: Alurnus
- Species: A. chapuisi

Binomial name
- Alurnus chapuisi Uhmann & Jolivet, 1952

Species of beetle

Alurnus chapuisi is a species of beetle of the family Chrysomelidae. It is found in Colombia.

== Description ==
Adults reach a length of about 33 mm. Adults have a black head, pronotum and legs. The elytron is yellow with four black spots and a black basal margin.
