= Alurnus octopunctatus =

Scientific classification
- Kingdom: Animalia
- Phylum: Arthropoda
- Clade: Pancrustacea
- Class: Insecta
- Order: Coleoptera
- Suborder: Polyphaga
- Infraorder: Cucujiformia
- Family: Chrysomelidae
- Genus: Alurnus
- Species: A. octopunctatus

Binomial name
- Alurnus octopunctatus Fairmaire, 1851

Synonyms
- Alurnus dryas Thomson, 1857; Alurnus octopunctatus fairmairei Jacobson, 1899; Alurnus octopunctatus marginicollis Jacobson, 1899

Species of beetle

Alurnus octopunctatus is a species of beetle of the family Chrysomelidae. It is found in Colombia and Venezuela.

== Description ==
Adults reach a length of about 20 mm. Adults have a shining black head, pronotum and legs, while the elytron is yellowish with black lateral and apical margins and eight black spots.
