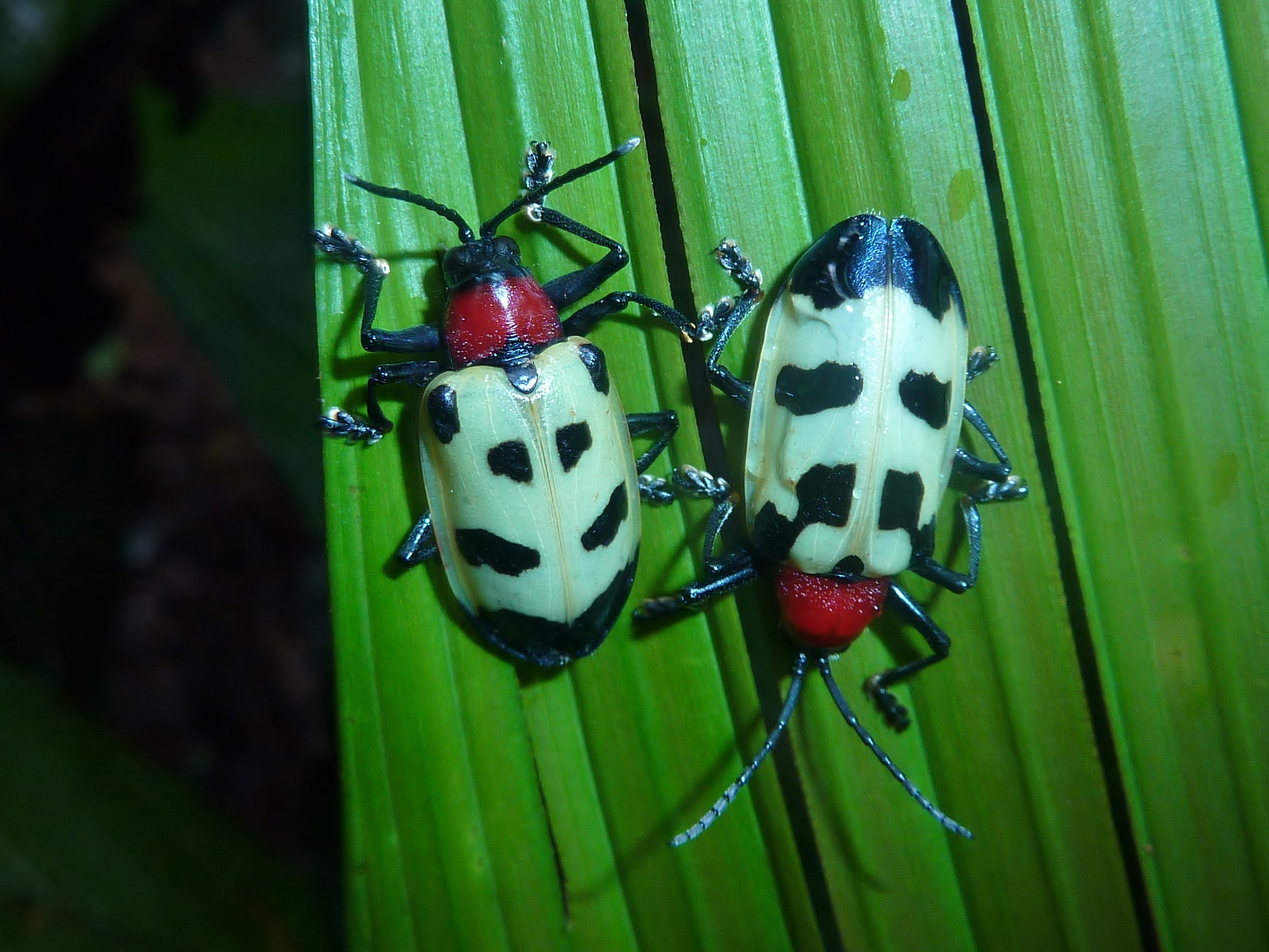

Scientific classification
- Kingdom: Animalia
- Phylum: Arthropoda
- Clade: Pancrustacea
- Class: Insecta
- Order: Coleoptera
- Suborder: Polyphaga
- Infraorder: Cucujiformia
- Family: Chrysomelidae
- Genus: Alurnus
- Species: A. ornatus

Binomial name
- Alurnus ornatus Baly, 1869

= Alurnus ornatus =

Species of beetle

Alurnus ornatus is a species of beetle in the family Chrysomelidae that can grow 19–27 millimeters in length. It is found in Colombia, Costa Rica, Nicaragua, and Panamá.

The adult beetles have head, antennae, scutellum, legs, and venter black. The pronotum is red with black apical and basal margins, while the elytra are mostly yellow except for black spots and apical quarters.

Adults of this species have been collected from Chamaedorea palms.
