= Alurnus elysianus =

Scientific classification
- Kingdom: Animalia
- Phylum: Arthropoda
- Clade: Pancrustacea
- Class: Insecta
- Order: Coleoptera
- Suborder: Polyphaga
- Infraorder: Cucujiformia
- Family: Chrysomelidae
- Genus: Alurnus
- Species: A. elysianus

Binomial name
- Alurnus elysianus Thomson, 1856

Synonyms
- Alurnus lydiae Uhmann, 1928

Species of beetle

Alurnus elysianus is a species of beetle of the family Chrysomelidae. It is found in Brazil (Amazonas) and Guyana.

== Description ==
Adults reach a length of about 25 mm. Adults have a dark metallic blue head, pronotum and legs, while the elytron is yellow with the apical one-fourth dark metallic blue.
