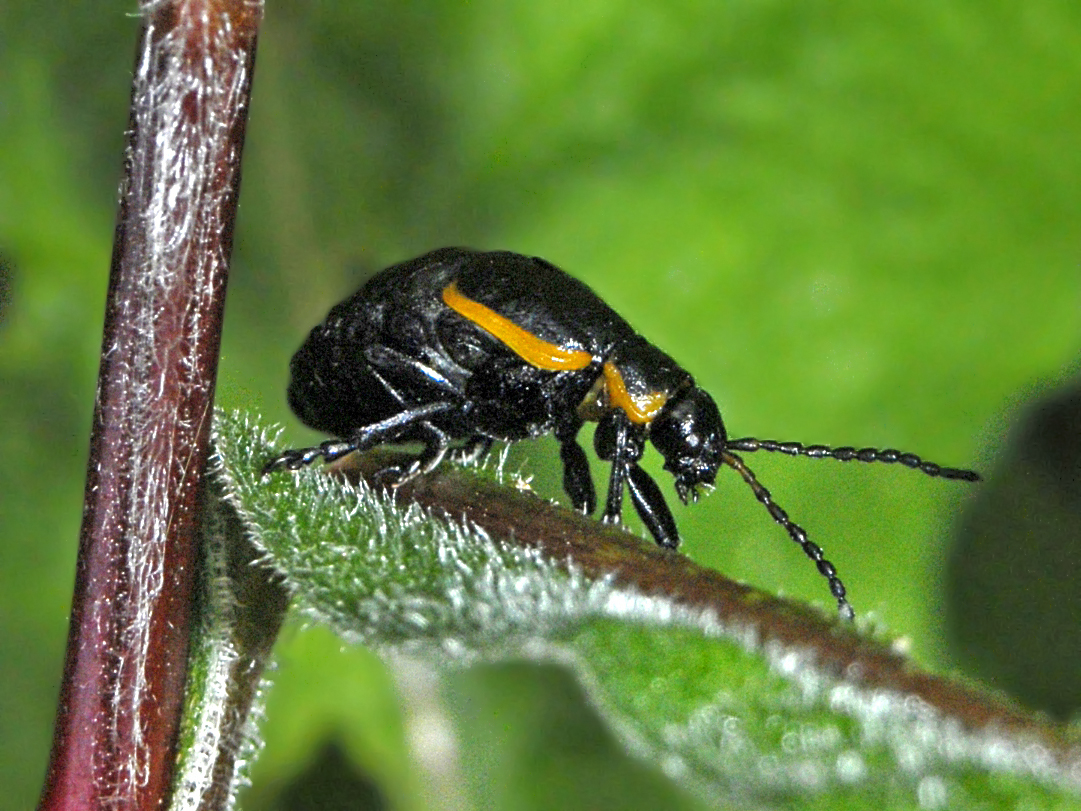

Scientific classification
- Kingdom: Animalia
- Phylum: Arthropoda
- Clade: Pancrustacea
- Class: Insecta
- Order: Coleoptera
- Suborder: Polyphaga
- Infraorder: Cucujiformia
- Family: Chrysomelidae
- Subfamily: Galerucinae
- Genus: Arima
- Species: A. marginata

Binomial name
- Arima marginata (Fabricius, 1781)

Synonyms
- Arima brevipennis (Illiger, 1805); Galleruca brevipennis Illiger, 1805; Meloe marginata Fabricius, 1781

= Arima marginata =

Species of beetle

Arima marginata is a species of leaf beetles of the subfamily Galerucinae in the family Chrysomelidae.

== Subspecies ==
Subspecies include:

- Arima marginata caprai Havelka, 1959
- Arima marginata freyi Havelka, 1959
- Arima marginata heyrovskyi Havelka, 1959
- Arima marginata marginata (Fabricius, 1781)
- Arima marginata obenbergeri Havelka, 1959
- Arima marginata pseudobrachyptera Havelka, 1959

== Distribution ==
This species is only found in the Southeast France and in the Northwestern Italy.

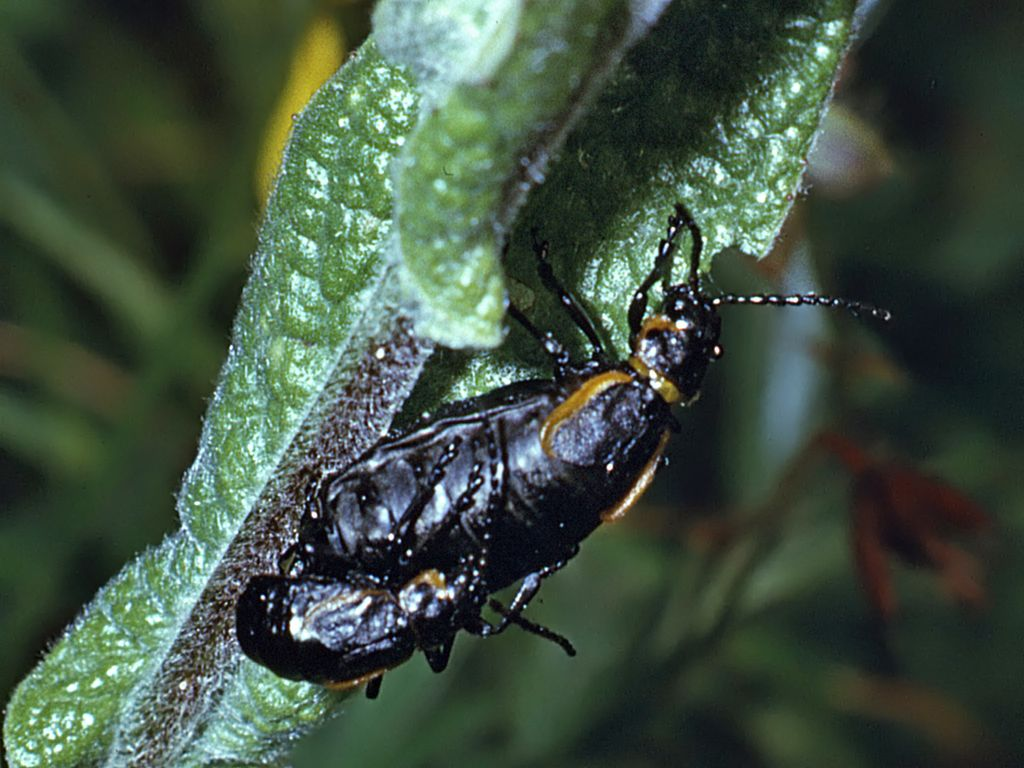
Mating pair

== Description ==
Arima marginata can reach a body length of about 12–20 mm (0.47–0.79 in) in females, of about 6–12 mm (0.24–0.47 in) in males. Therefore this species presents a clear sexual dimorphism, as females are generally much larger than males. Moreover females outnumber males.

These beetles are shiny black with orange marginal bands on the edge of the pronotum and the elytra. Elytra cover only two abdominal segments.

Antennae are filiform and the abdomen is voluminous. The last sternites is composed by one piece, in the shape of a ginkgo leaf, while the genital plate is made of two parts. These beetles do not fly, but they are very active.

== Biology ==
Adults of this species can be found from April to August, and have one generation per year (univoltine). Adults overwinter in the ground. Female lays about 80 eggs on the leaves of the host plants, and the larvae come out after about ten days. Larvae of A. marginata can reach a body length of about 12 mm (0.47 in). They are black and highly polyphagous. They mainly feed on the leaves of many aromatic Lamiaceae species (Lavandula, Mentha, Origanum, Salvia, Basil, Thymus, etc.).
