= Alurnus obliquus =

Scientific classification
- Kingdom: Animalia
- Phylum: Arthropoda
- Clade: Pancrustacea
- Class: Insecta
- Order: Coleoptera
- Suborder: Polyphaga
- Infraorder: Cucujiformia
- Family: Chrysomelidae
- Genus: Alurnus
- Species: A. obliquus

Binomial name
- Alurnus obliquus Uhmann, 1961

Synonyms
- Alurnus obliquus epipleuralis Uhmann, 1961

Species of beetle

Alurnus obliquus is a species of beetle of the family Chrysomelidae. It is found in Bolivia and Peru.

== Description ==
Adults reach a length of about 25 mm. Adults have a black head, pronotum and legs, while the elytron is dark blue-black with yellowish-brown markings.
