= Alurnus secernendus =

Scientific classification
- Kingdom: Animalia
- Phylum: Arthropoda
- Clade: Pancrustacea
- Class: Insecta
- Order: Coleoptera
- Suborder: Polyphaga
- Infraorder: Cucujiformia
- Family: Chrysomelidae
- Genus: Alurnus
- Species: A. secernendus

Binomial name
- Alurnus secernendus Uhmann, 1932

Species of beetle

Alurnus secernendus is a species of beetle of the family Chrysomelidae. It is found in Ecuador.

== Description ==
Adults reach a length of about 17–20 mm. Adults have a black head and legs, while the pronotum is yellow with a large black spot. The elytron is yellow with black markings and margins.
