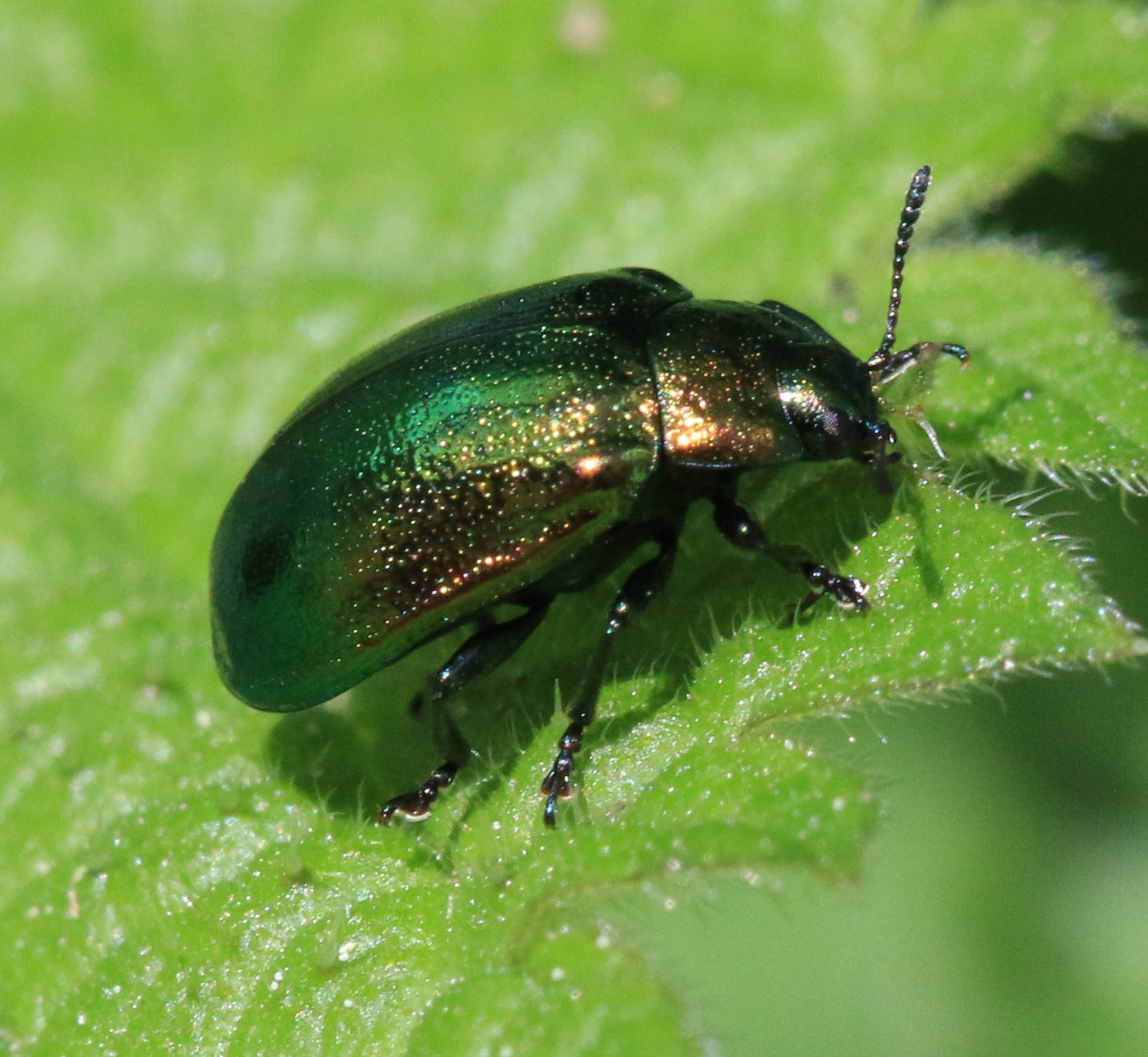
- Plagiosterna aenea

Scientific classification
- Kingdom: Animalia
- Phylum: Arthropoda
- Clade: Pancrustacea
- Class: Insecta
- Order: Coleoptera
- Suborder: Polyphaga
- Infraorder: Cucujiformia
- Family: Chrysomelidae
- Subfamily: Chrysomelinae
- Tribe: Chrysomelini
- Genus: Plagiosterna; Motschulsky, 1860

= Plagiosterna =

Genus of beetles

Plagiosterna is a genus of beetles belonging to the family Chrysomelidae.

== Selected species ==
The following species are recognised in the genus Plagiosterna:

- Plagiosterna adamsii (Baly, 1864)
- Plagiosterna aenea (Linnaeus, 1758)
- Plagiosterna maculicollis (Jacoby, 1890)
- Plagiosterna nigripes Kimoto, 1969
- Plagiosterna placida (Chen, 1934)
