= Alurnus orbignyi =

Scientific classification
- Kingdom: Animalia
- Phylum: Arthropoda
- Clade: Pancrustacea
- Class: Insecta
- Order: Coleoptera
- Suborder: Polyphaga
- Infraorder: Cucujiformia
- Family: Chrysomelidae
- Genus: Alurnus
- Species: A. orbignyi

Binomial name
- Alurnus orbignyi Guérin-Méneville, 1840

Synonyms
- Alurnus d'orbignyi Guérin-Méneville, 1840; Alurnus orbignyi balyi Jacobson, 1899; Alurnus saundersii Baly, 1858; Alurnus iheringi Weise, 1910

Species of beetle

Alurnus orbignyi is a species of beetle of the family Chrysomelidae. It is found in Argentina, Bolivia, Brazil, Ecuador, Peru and Venezuela.

== Description ==
Adults reach a length of about 28–37 mm. Adults have a shining black head and legs, while the pronotum is reddish with a black basal spot. The elytron is pale yellow with a black spot.

== Biology ==
They have been recorded feeding on Aroides species.
