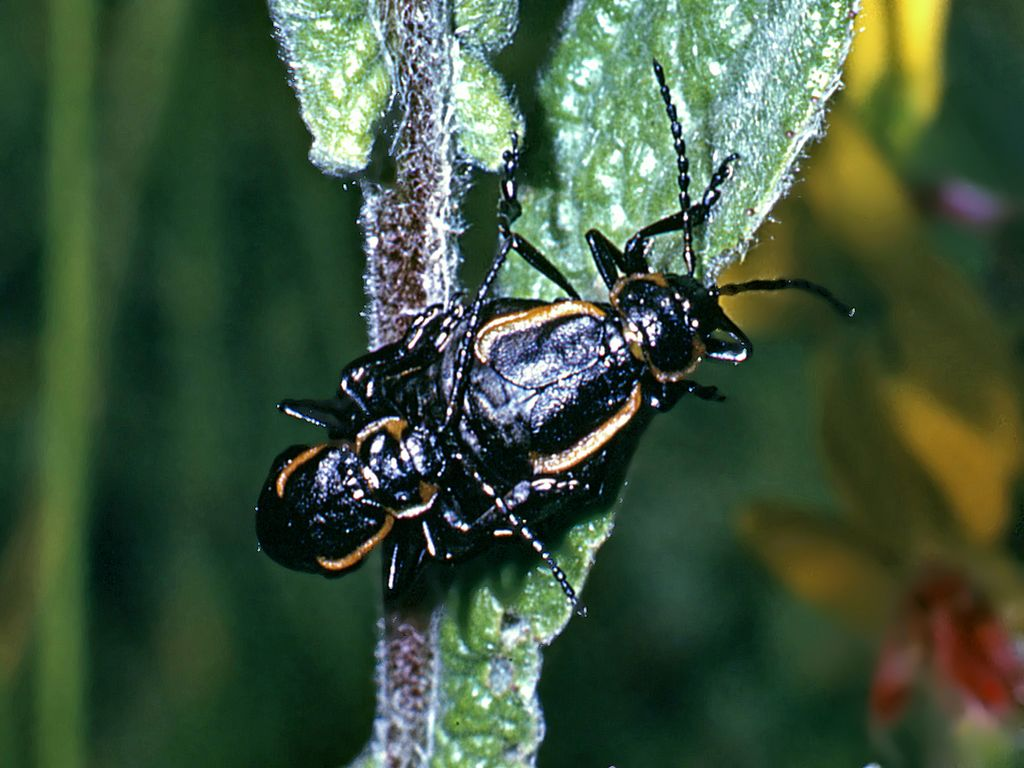
- Mating pair of Arima marginata

Scientific classification
- Kingdom: Animalia
- Phylum: Arthropoda
- Clade: Pancrustacea
- Class: Insecta
- Order: Coleoptera
- Suborder: Polyphaga
- Infraorder: Cucujiformia
- Family: Chrysomelidae
- Subfamily: Galerucinae
- Genus: Arima; Chapuis, 1875

= Arima (beetle) =

Genus of beetles

Arima is a genus of leaf beetles (Chrysomelidae) belonging to the subfamily Galerucinae. Species of this genus are found in France, on the Italian mainland, and in Sicily. They present clear sexual dimorphism, as females are generally much larger than males.

== Species ==
- Arima brachyptera (Küster, 1844)
- Arima buai Havelka, 1959
- Arima marginata (Fabricius, 1781)
- Arima maritima Bua, 1953
