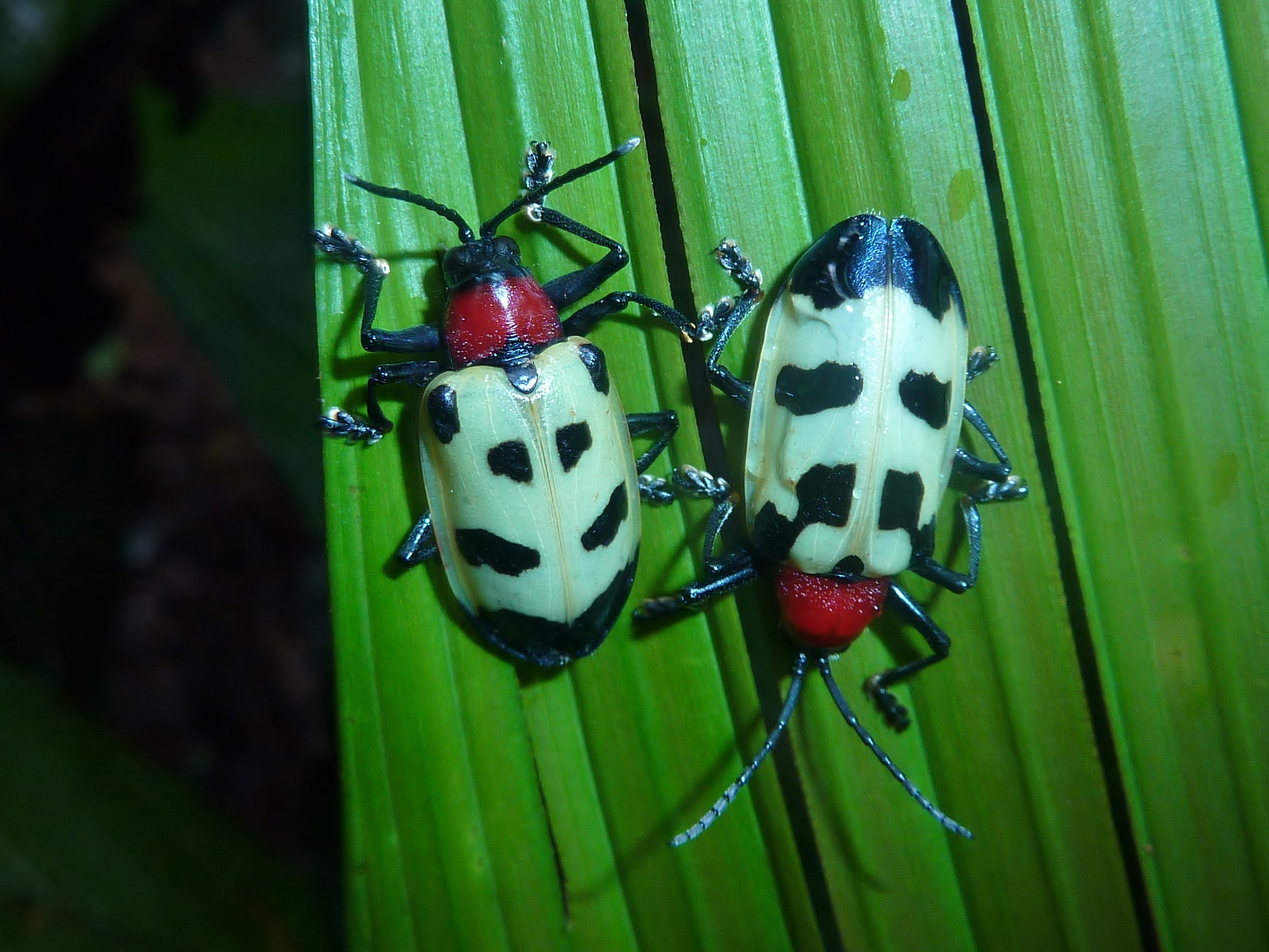
- Alurnus ornatus

Scientific classification
- Kingdom: Animalia
- Phylum: Arthropoda
- Clade: Pancrustacea
- Class: Insecta
- Order: Coleoptera
- Suborder: Polyphaga
- Infraorder: Cucujiformia
- Family: Chrysomelidae
- Tribe: Alurnini
- Genus: Alurnus; Fabricius, 1775

Species
- See text

Synonyms
- Poecilalurnus Jacobson, 1899

= Alurnus =

Genus of beetles

Alurnus is a genus of beetles in the family Chrysomelidae.

== Species ==
The following species are accepted within Alurnus:

- Alurnus batesii Baly, 1864
- Alurnus bicolor Staines, 2013
- Alurnus bipunctatus Olivier, 1792
- Alurnus boucardi Rosenberg, 1898
- Alurnus chapuisi Uhmann and Jolivet, 1952
- Alurnus costalis Rosenberg, 1898
- Alurnus crenatus Staines, 2013
- Alurnus dallieri Pic, 1926
- Alurnus eckardtae Günther, 1936
- Alurnus elysianus Thomson, 1856
- Alurnus grossus Fabricius, 1775
- Alurnus humeralis Rosenberg, 1898
- Alurnus lansbergei Sallé, 1849
- Alurnus mutabilis Waterhouse, 1881
- Alurnus obliquus Uhmann, 1961
- Alurnus octopunctatus Fairmaire, 1851
- Alurnus orbignyi Guérin-Méneville, 1840
- Alurnus ornatus Baly, 1869
- Alurnus salvini Baly, 1885
- Alurnus secernendus Uhmann, 1932b
- Alurnus sexguttatus Rosenberg, 1898
- Alurnus undatus Brême, 1844
