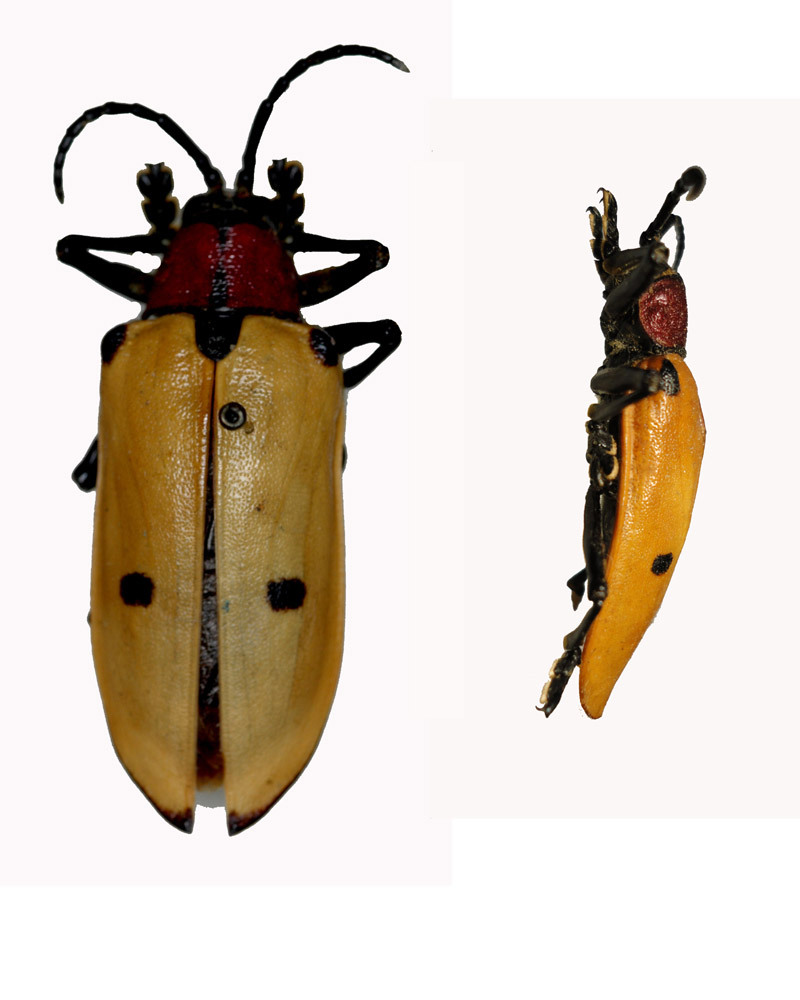

Scientific classification
- Kingdom: Animalia
- Phylum: Arthropoda
- Clade: Pancrustacea
- Class: Insecta
- Order: Coleoptera
- Suborder: Polyphaga
- Infraorder: Cucujiformia
- Family: Chrysomelidae
- Genus: Alurnus
- Species: A. humeralis

Binomial name
- Alurnus humeralis Rosenberg, 1898

Synonyms
- Alurnus forticornis Weise, 1910; Alurnus maximus Jacobson, 1899; Alurnus d'orbignyi humeralis; Alurnus orbignyi humeralis; Alurnus saundersii humeralis

= Alurnus humeralis =

Species of beetle

Alurnus humeralis is a species of beetle of the family Chrysomelidae. It is found in Bolivia, Colombia, Ecuador and Peru.

== Description ==
Adults reach a length of about 27–37 mm. Adults have a black head and legs, while the pronotum is red and the elytron is yellow with two black spots, one with a red margin.

== Biology ==
They have been recorded feeding on Cocos nucifera, Elaeis guineensis and Astrocaryum chonta.
