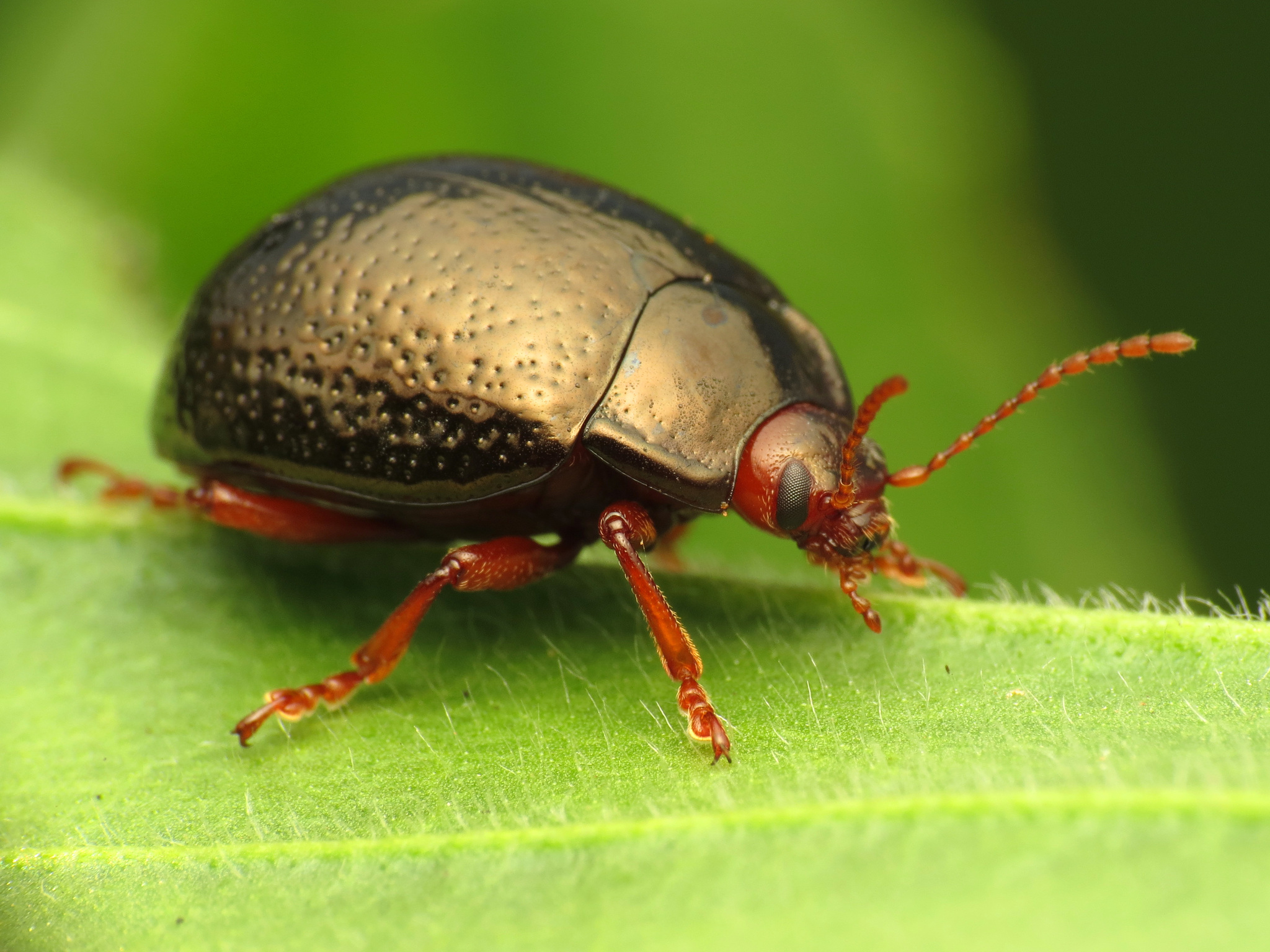

Scientific classification
- Kingdom: Animalia
- Phylum: Arthropoda
- Clade: Pancrustacea
- Class: Insecta
- Order: Coleoptera
- Suborder: Polyphaga
- Infraorder: Cucujiformia
- Family: Chrysomelidae
- Genus: Chrysolina
- Subgenus: Chrysolina
- Species: C. bankii

Binomial name
- Chrysolina bankii (Fabricius, 1775)

Synonyms
- Chrysolina banksi Chrysomela bankii

= Chrysolina bankii =

Species of beetle

Chrysolina bankii, the bronze beetle or Bank's leaf beetle, is a species of leaf beetle native to western Europe and the western Mediterranean Basin, (including Macaronesia). European countries this species lives in include Italy, France, Spain, Portugal, Ireland, and the United Kingdom. It has also been introduced to the US, where its range is expanding. It has an established population in California, where it is present around the San Francisco Bay and has further populations extending north to coastal regions in cities in and around Fort Bragg, and south to northern parts of Monterey County. There is an additional population in Richmond, Virginia. This species lives in various habitats such as open grasslands, meadows, woodland edges, and coastal areas, mainly prefereing those that are open, sunny, and have a variety of plants to feed on. Females lay eggs on the underside of leaves. When overwintering, species can mainly be found as larva in cold climates, however adults can also be found in warmer locations.

Chrysolina bankii adults are 8-10.7 mm in length. They are metallic bronze in color, with orange-brown legs. Their elytra have puncture marks. They feed on numerous types of leaves, but especially those in Asteraceae and Lamiaceae. Ribwort plantain is also a favorite plant for this species to feed on.

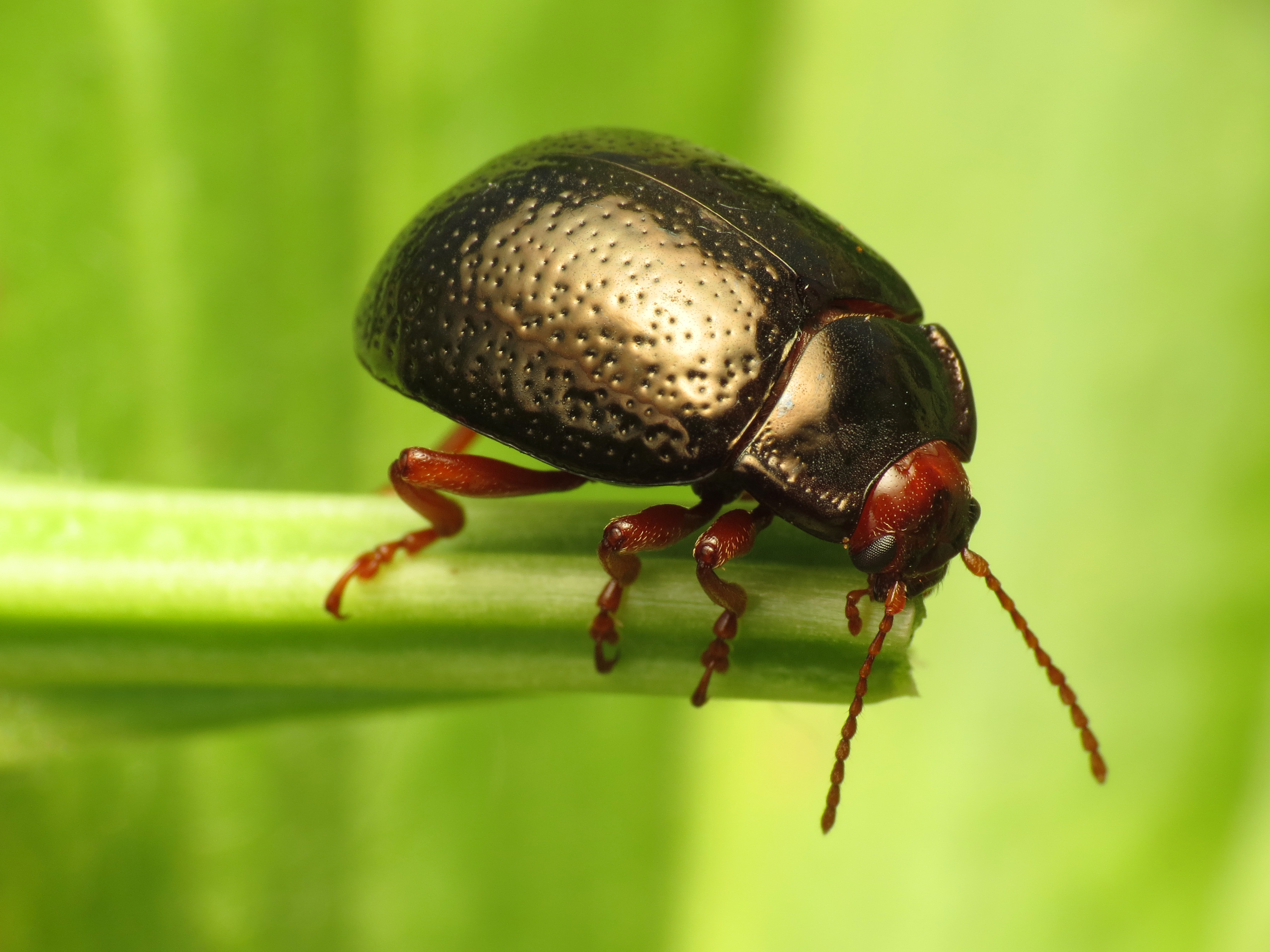
Eating a broadleaf plantain
