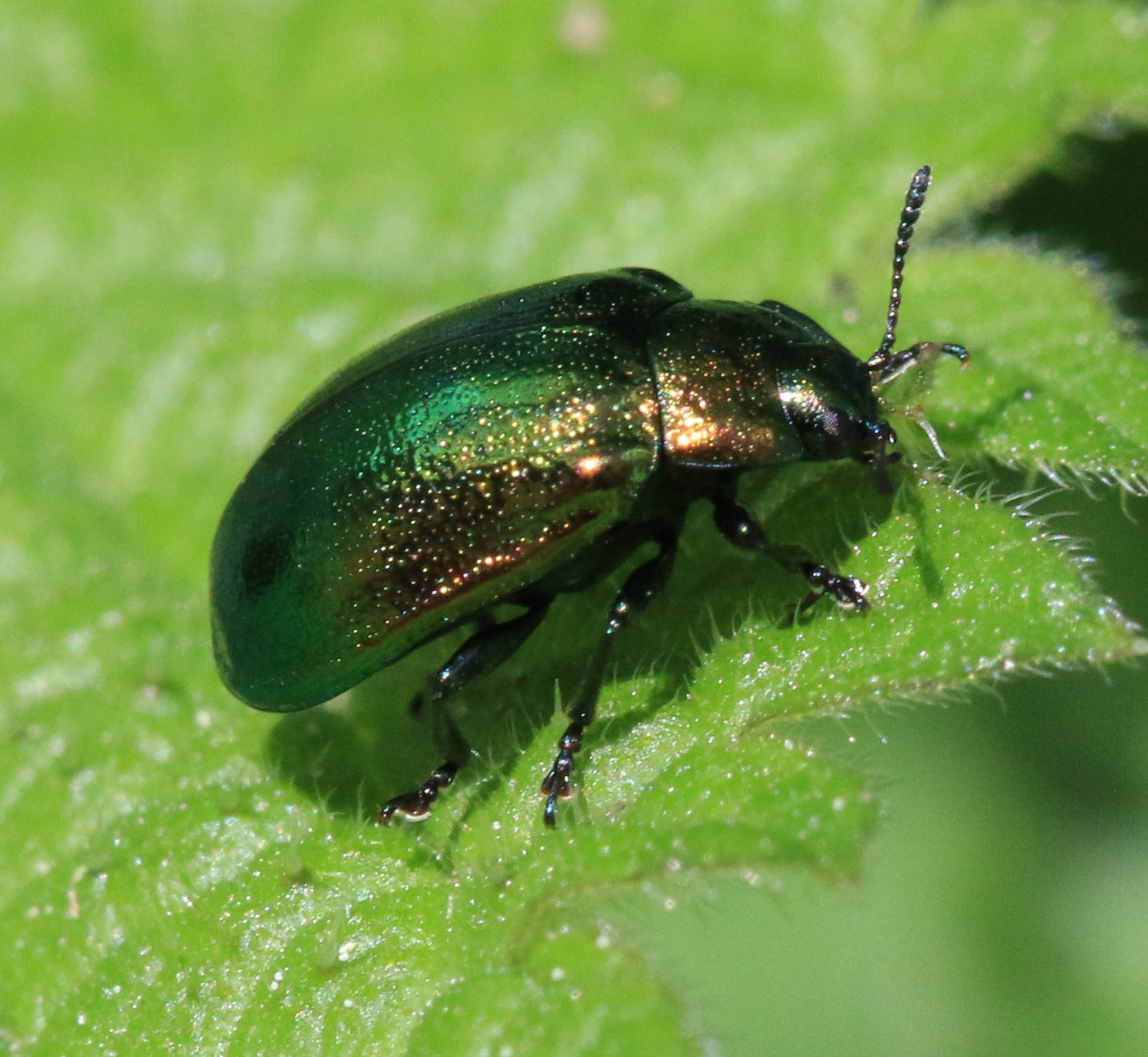

Scientific classification
- Kingdom: Animalia
- Phylum: Arthropoda
- Class: Insecta
- Order: Coleoptera
- Suborder: Polyphaga
- Infraorder: Cucujiformia
- Family: Chrysomelidae
- Genus: Plagiosterna
- Species: P. aenea

Binomial name
- Plagiosterna aenea (Linnaeus, 1758)

= Plagiosterna aenea =

Species of beetle

Plagiosterna aenea is a species of leaf beetle native to Europe.
