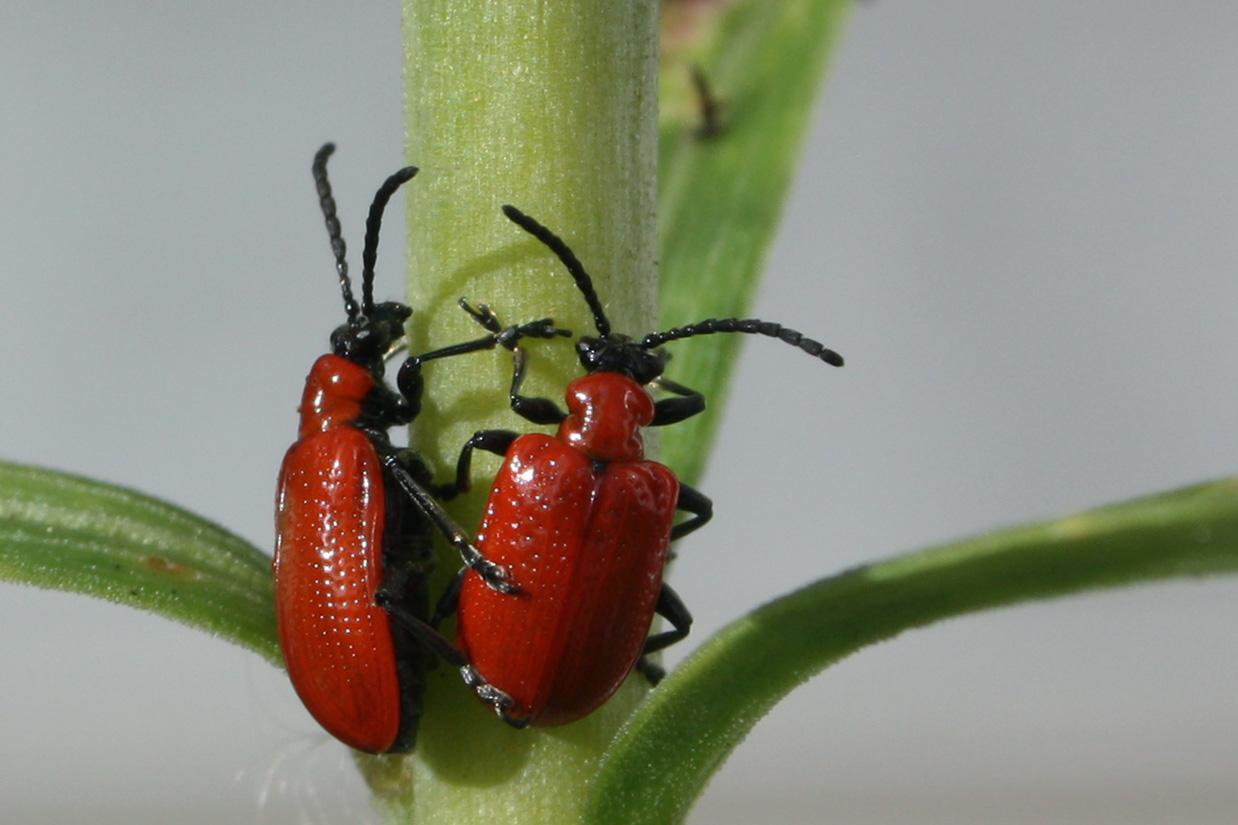
- Scarlet lily beetle Lilioceris lilii in Oxfordshire, UK

Scientific classification
- Kingdom: Animalia
- Phylum: Arthropoda
- Clade: Pancrustacea
- Class: Insecta
- Order: Coleoptera
- Suborder: Polyphaga
- Infraorder: Cucujiformia
- Superfamily: Chrysomeloidea
- Family: Chrysomelidae; Latreille, 1802

Subfamilies
- See text

= Leaf beetle =

Leaf beetle Temporal range: Aptian–Present

Family of beetles

The beetle family Chrysomelidae, commonly known as leaf beetles, includes over 37,000 (and probably at least 50,000) species in more than 2,500 genera, making it one of the largest and most commonly encountered of all beetle families. Numerous subfamilies are recognized, but the specifics of leaf beetle taxonomy and systematics are likely to change with ongoing research.

Adult and larval leaf beetles feed on a variety of plant tissue, with some being specialists of particular species or families of plant. Many are serious pests of cultivated plants, for example the Colorado potato beetle (Leptinotarsa decemlineata), the asparagus beetle (Crioceris asparagi), the cereal leaf beetle (Oulema melanopus), the mustard beetle (Phaedon cochleariae) and various flea beetles, and a few act as vectors of plant diseases. Others are beneficial due to their use in biocontrol of invasive weeds. Some Chrysomelidae are conspicuously colored, typically in glossy yellow to red or metallic blue-green hues, and some (especially Cassidinae) have spectacularly bizarre shapes. Thus, they are highly popular among insect collectors.

== Description ==
Imago (adult form) of leaf beetles are small to medium-sized, with most species ranging from 1 to 18 mm (0.039 to 0.709 in) in length, excluding appendages, with just a few larger species such as Alurnus humeralis, which reaches 35 mm (1.4 in). The bodies of most species tend to be dome-shaped, and oval in dorsal view (though some species are more rounded or elongated), and they often possess a metallic luster or multiple colors. In most specimens, the antennae are notably shorter than head, thorax, and abdomen, i.e. not more than half their combined length. The second antennal segment is of normal size (which differentiates leaf beetles from the closely related longhorn beetles of family Cerambycidae). In most species, the antennal segments are of a more or less equal shape, at most they gradually widen towards the tip, although some Galerucinae in particular have modified segments, mainly in males. The first segment of the antenna in most cases is larger than the following ones. The pronotum of leaf beetles varies between species. In most, it is slightly to highly domed and trapezoidal to rounded-squarish in dorsal view. In some subfamilies such as the Cassidinae and to a lesser extent the Cryptocephalinae, the head is covered by the pronotum and thus not visible from above. The first three sternites are not fused, instead being linked by mobile sutures. Most species possess wings, although the level of development and thus flight ability varies widely, including within a single species, and some are flightless with fused elytra.

The tarsal formula of leaf beetles may be helpful in identifying them; the tarsal formula may appear to be 4-4-4, but is actually 5-5-5 as the fourth tarsal segment is very small and hidden by the third. As with many taxa, no single character defines Chrysomelidae; instead, the family is delineated by a set of characters. Some lineages are only distinguished with difficulty from the closely related longhorn beetles, namely by the antennae not arising from frontal tubercles. Members of former chrysomelid subfamilies (Orsodacnidae and Megalopodidae) are also difficult to differentiate from true chrysomelids.

== Subfamilies ==
The family includes these subfamilies:

- Bruchinae Latreille, 1802 – bean weevils or seed beetles
- Cassidinae Gyllenhaal, 1813 – tortoise beetles; includes the former "Hispinae"
- Chrysomelinae Latreille, 1802 – broad-bodied leaf beetles
- Criocerinae Latreille, 1804 – asparagus beetles, lily beetles, etc.
- Cryptocephalinae Gyllenhaal, 1813 – cylindrical leaf beetles and warty leaf beetles; includes former "Chlamisinae" and "Clytrinae"
- Donaciinae Kirby, 1837 – longhorned leaf beetles
- Eumolpinae Hope, 1840 – oval leaf beetles
- Galerucinae Latreille, 1802 – includes the former "Alticinae" (flea beetles)
- Lamprosomatinae Lacordaire, 1848
- Sagrinae Leach, 1815 – frog-legged beetles or kangaroo beetles
- Spilopyrinae Chapuis, 1874
- Synetinae LeConte & Horn, 1883 – sometimes considered a tribe of Eumolpinae

Until recently, the subfamily Bruchinae was considered a separate family, while two former subfamilies are presently considered families (Orsodacnidae and Megalopodidae). Other commonly recognized subfamilies have recently been grouped with other subfamilies, usually reducing them to tribal rank (e.g., the former Alticinae, Chlamisinae, Clytrinae, and Hispinae). The extinct subfamily Protoscelidinae, containing fossils described from the Middle to Late Jurassic Karabastau Formation, Kazakhstan, has been transferred to the family Anthribidae.

== Diet ==
Chrysomelidae in general are herbivorous. Adults mostly feed on leaves and flowers of angiosperm plants, while larval diets are diverse.

- Bruchinae larvae are seed-borers, usually in seeds of legumes. Many adults feed on pollen, not necessarily the same species as that of the larval host. Some do not feed as adults.
- Cassidinae larvae may be leaf miners (many of the former Hispinae), stemborers (e.g. Estigmena) and external leaf feeders (e.g. Leptispa, Oediopalpa).
- Chrysomelinae generally feed on leaves as adults and larvae, though some species feed on flowers instead.
- Criocerinae larvae are usually leaf miners or feed externally on leaves. Some species are gallers instead.
- Eumolpinae larvae feed on roots.
- Most Cryptocephalinae larvae live and feed in leaf litter, making them detritivores, while a few feed on green leaves. Some Cryptocephalinae have larvae that live in ant nests (myrmecophily), where they feed on dead plant or even dead animal matter.
- The semi-aquatic Donaciinae have larvae feeding on sap from the roots of aquatic plants. In addition to food, they also obtain oxygen this way, from the plant's intercellular spaces. Adults feed on leaves of aquatic plants.
- Galerucinae are quite varied, with larvae living in soil and feeding on rootlets (e.g. Aulacophora, Cerotoma, Diabrotica), mining leaves (some Monoxia) or feeding externally on plants (e.g. Arima, Galeruca, Galerucella).
- Lamprosomatinae larvae feed on green plant parts or graze on bark.
- Sagrinae larvae mostly form galls in stems of shrubs, though Mecynodera balyi instead feeds inside seed pods of Pandorea vines. Adults feed on pollen.
- Spilopyrinae larvae are external leaf feeders.
- Synetinae larvae feed on roots, mainly of trees in cold northern forests.

To be able to digest the plant matter, the beetles use enzymes such as pectinases. This group of enzymes are either produced by the beetles themselves, due to horizontal gene transfer, or symbiotic bacteria provides them with the enzymes. Both methods do not occur within the same species; they are never used simultaneously.

== Predators ==
A Finnish researcher published an exhaustive paper describing the natural enemies of the alder leaf beetle Plagiosterna aenea and other species of leaf beetles observed in the field. Predators of chrysomelid eggs include true bugs such as Anthocoris nemorum and Orthotylus marginalis. Hoverflies (e.g. Parasyrphus nigritarsis) sometimes lay eggs adjacent to beetle egg clutches and when the fly larva hatches it consumes beetle eggs and young larvae. Larval predators include A. nemorum, the bug Rhacognathus punctatus, and the wasp Symmorphus bifasciatus. Some species of wasps, such as Polistes carolina, have been known to prey upon Chrysomelidae larvae after the eggs are laid in flowers. Adult beetles are consumed by R. punctatus. More information about natural enemies can be found in the articles about the chrysomelid beetles Chrysomela aeneicollis, Phratora laticollis and Phratora vitellinae.

== Internal phylogeny ==
Multiple molecular phylogenetic analyses have recovered three major clades within the family Chrysomelidae: a 'chrysomeline' clade consisting of the subfamilies Chrysomelinae (excluding Timarcha) and Galerucinae (including Alticini), a 'sagrine' clade consisting of subfamilies Bruchinae, Sagrinae, Criocerinae and Donaciinae, and a 'eumolpine' clade consisting of subfamilies Spilopyrinae, Cassidinae, Eumolpinae, Cryptocephalinae and Lamprosomatinae. The relationships of these major clades to each other are unclear, while the subfamily Synetinae and the genus Timarcha have unclear positions and may lie outside these clades.

The following phylogeny is based on the analysis by Nie and co-authors using mitochondrial genomes, published in 2019:

- Chrysomelidae
  - - - 'eumolpine' clade
        - - - - Cryptocephalinae
              - Lamprosomatinae
            - Eumolpinae
          - Cassidinae
        - Spilopyrinae
      - 'sagrine' clade
        - - - Criocerinae
            - Donaciinae
          - Bruchinae
        - Sagrinae
    - Synetinae
  - - 'chrysomeline' clade
      - - Galerucinae
        - Alticinae (Note: This group is usually considered as a tribe Alticini within Galerucinae, but is considered a subfamily by Nie and co-authors.)
      - Chrysomelinae (excluding Timarcha)
    - Timarcha

== Gallery ==
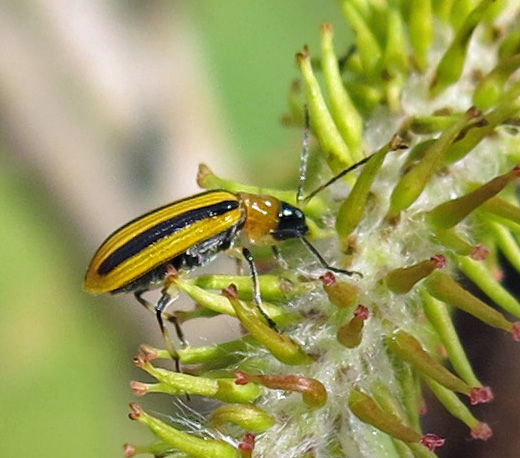
Acalymma vittatum

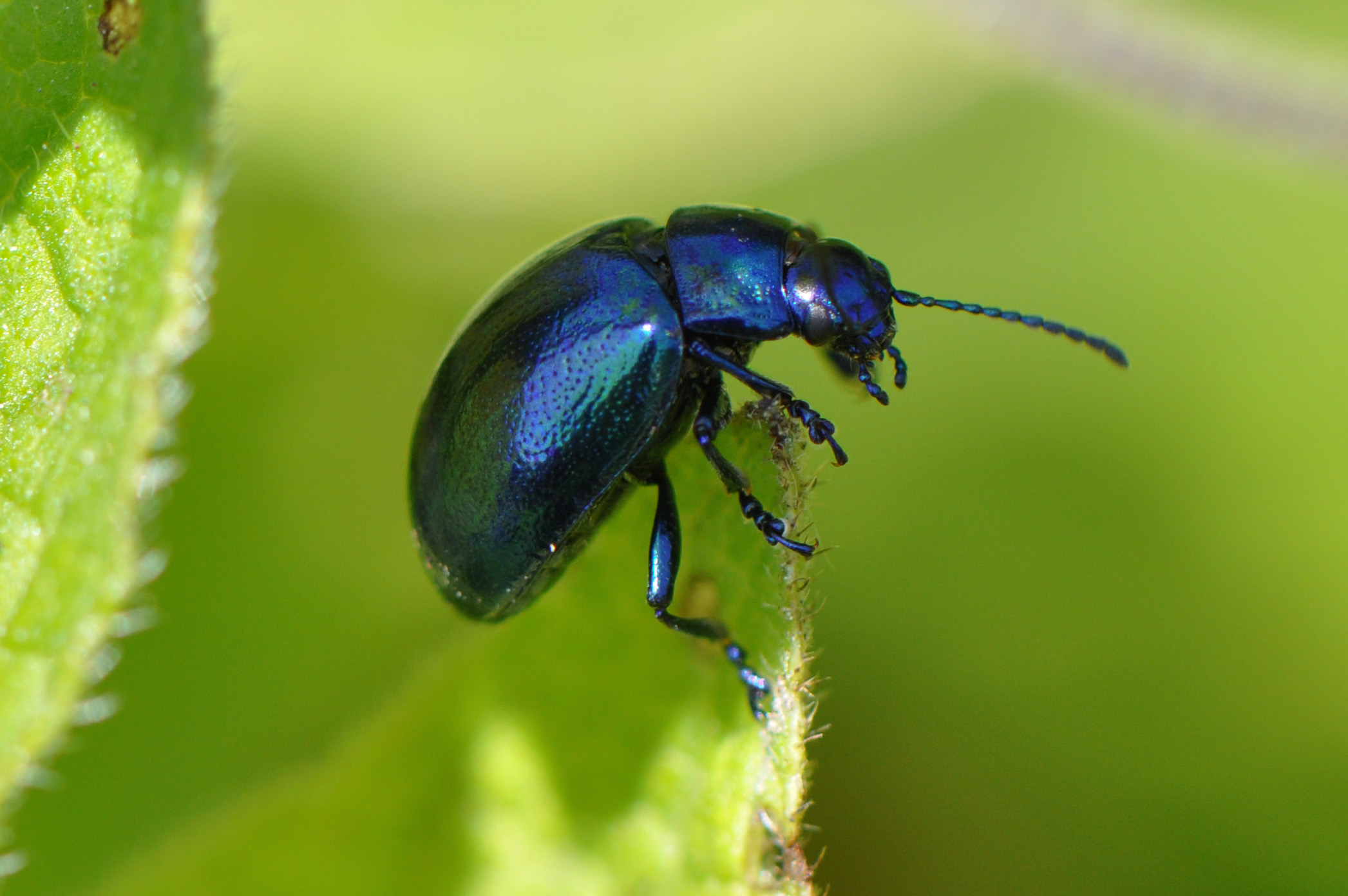
Agelastica alni

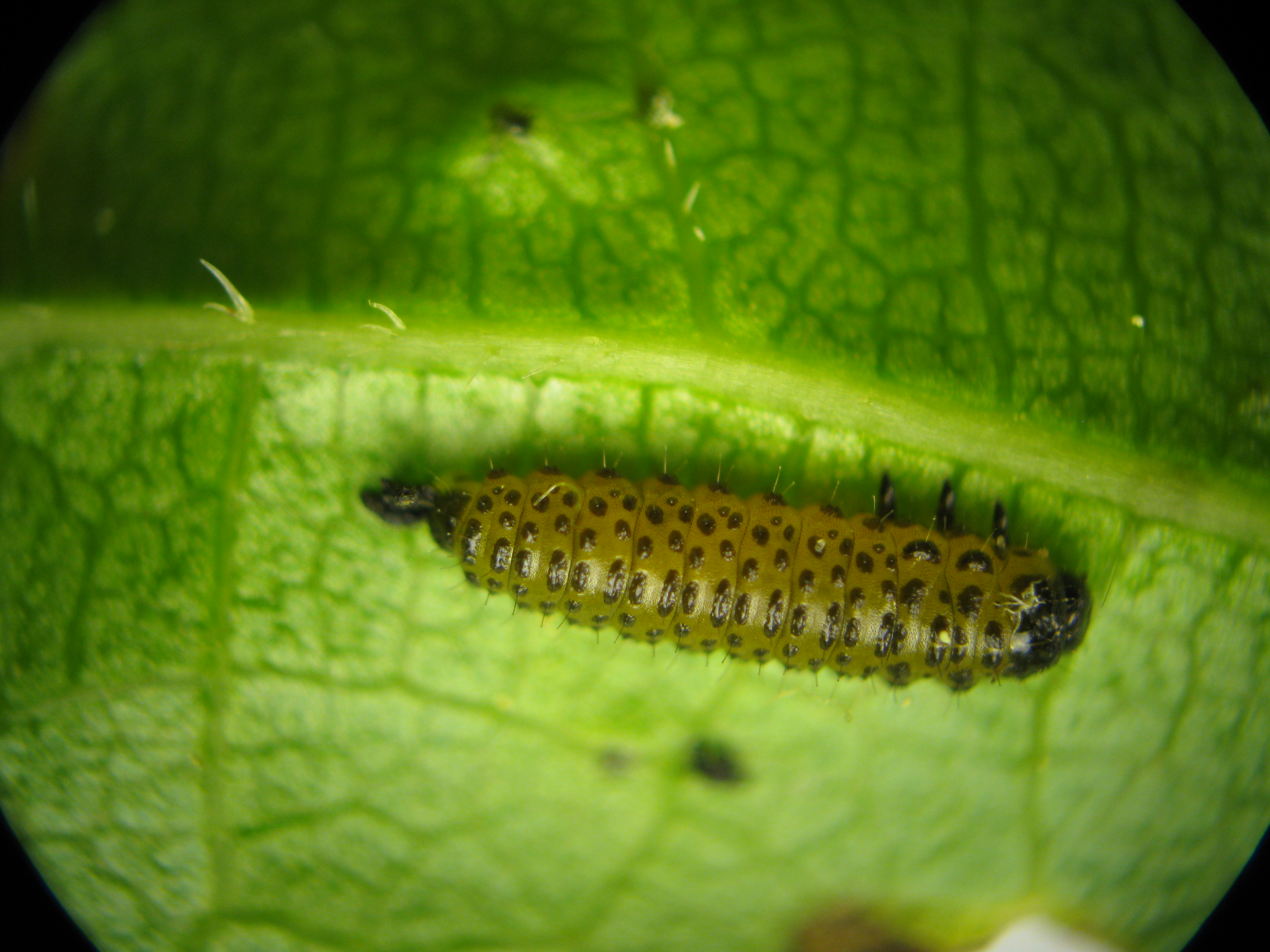
Altica, larva

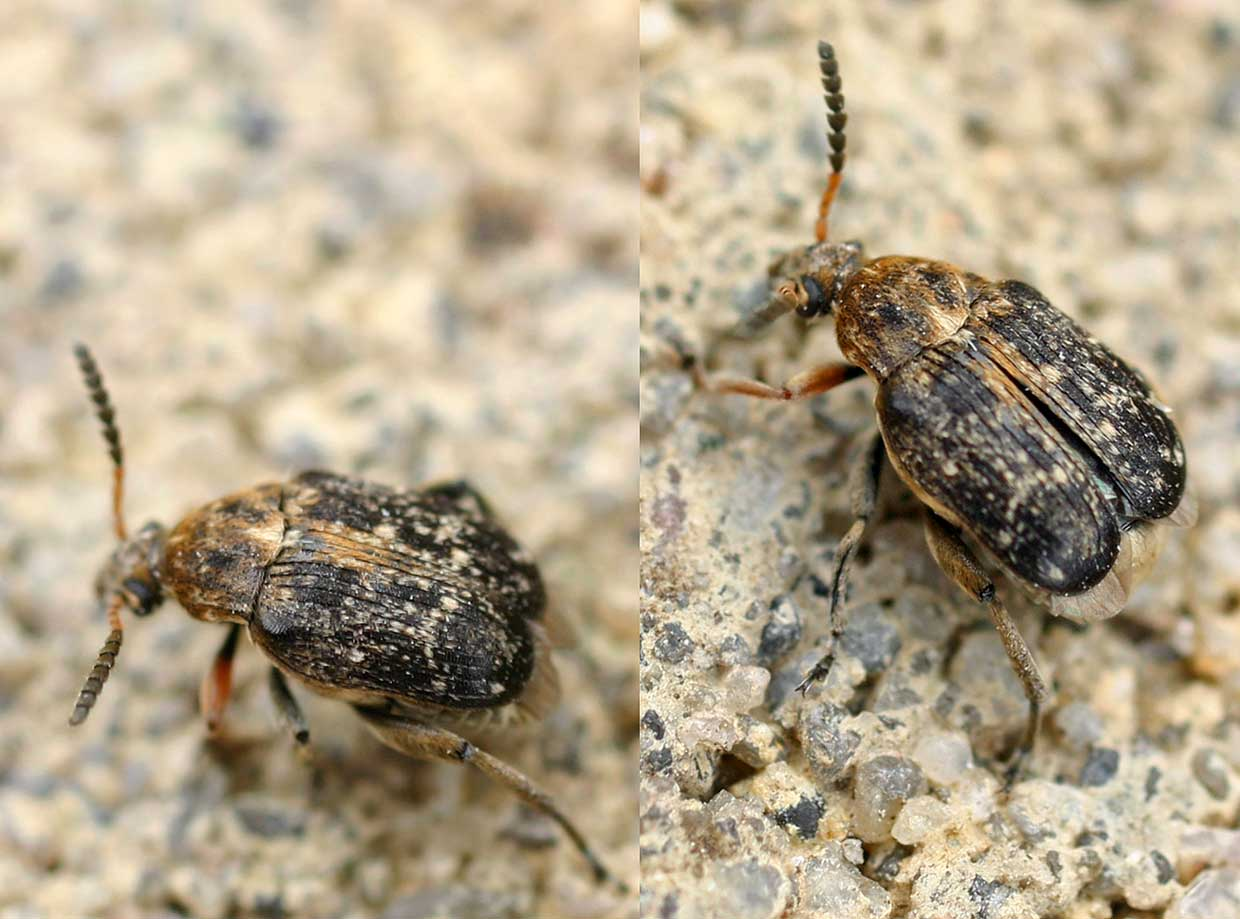
Bruchus pisorum (Bruchinae)

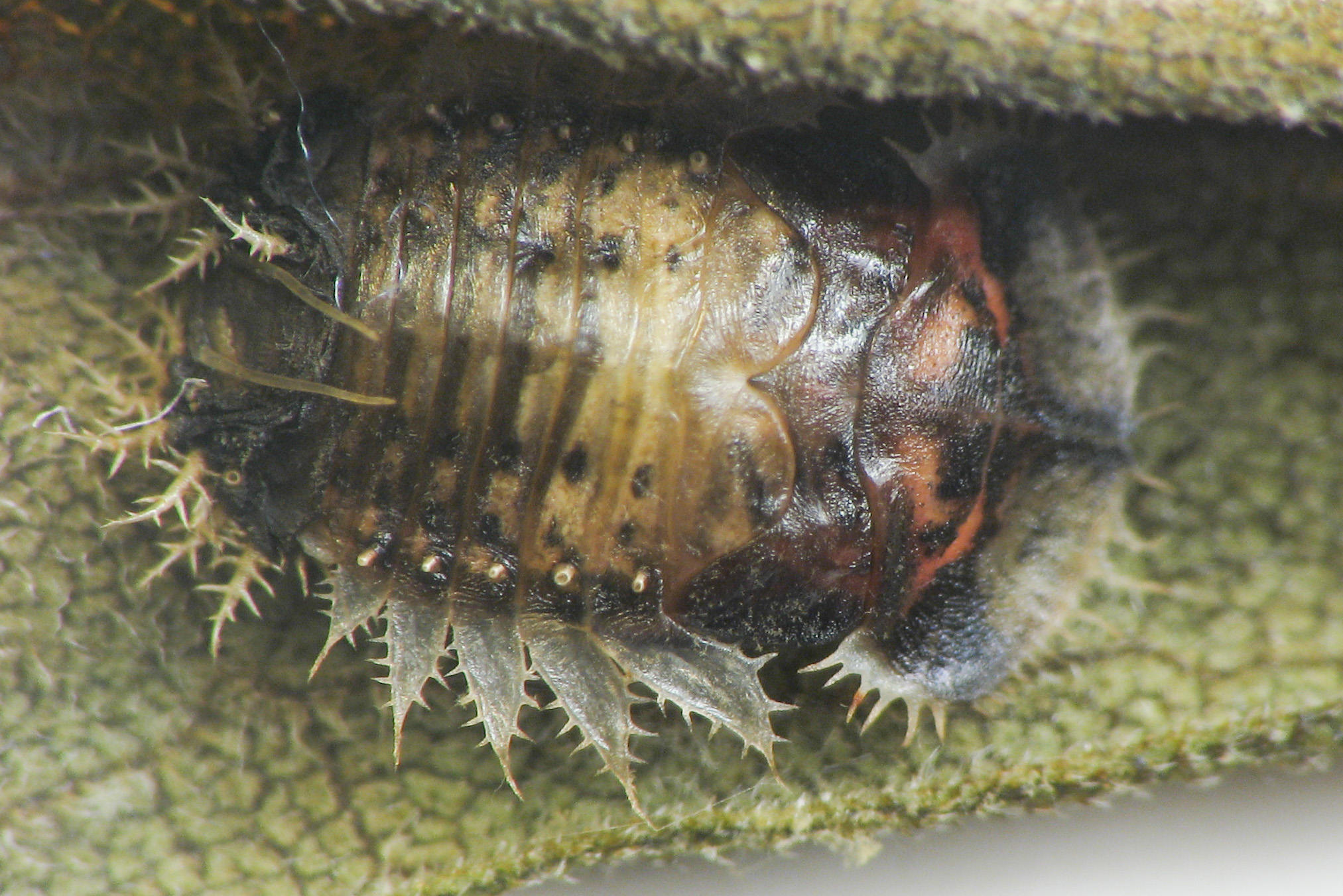
Charidotella sexpunctata, pupa

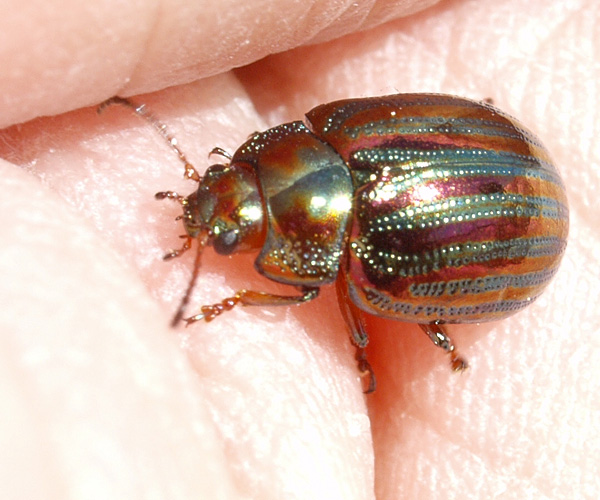
Chrysolina americana

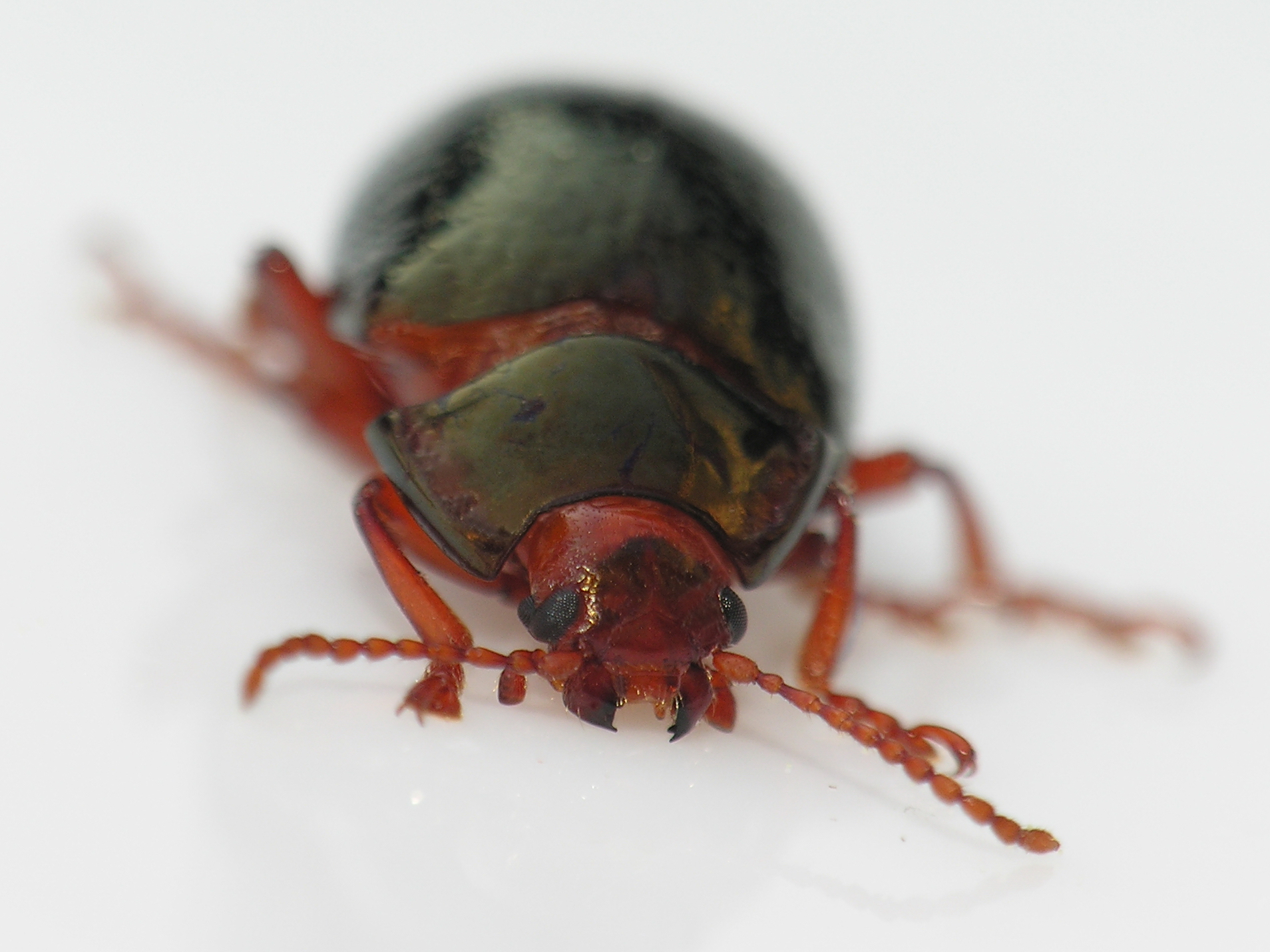
Chrysolina bankii

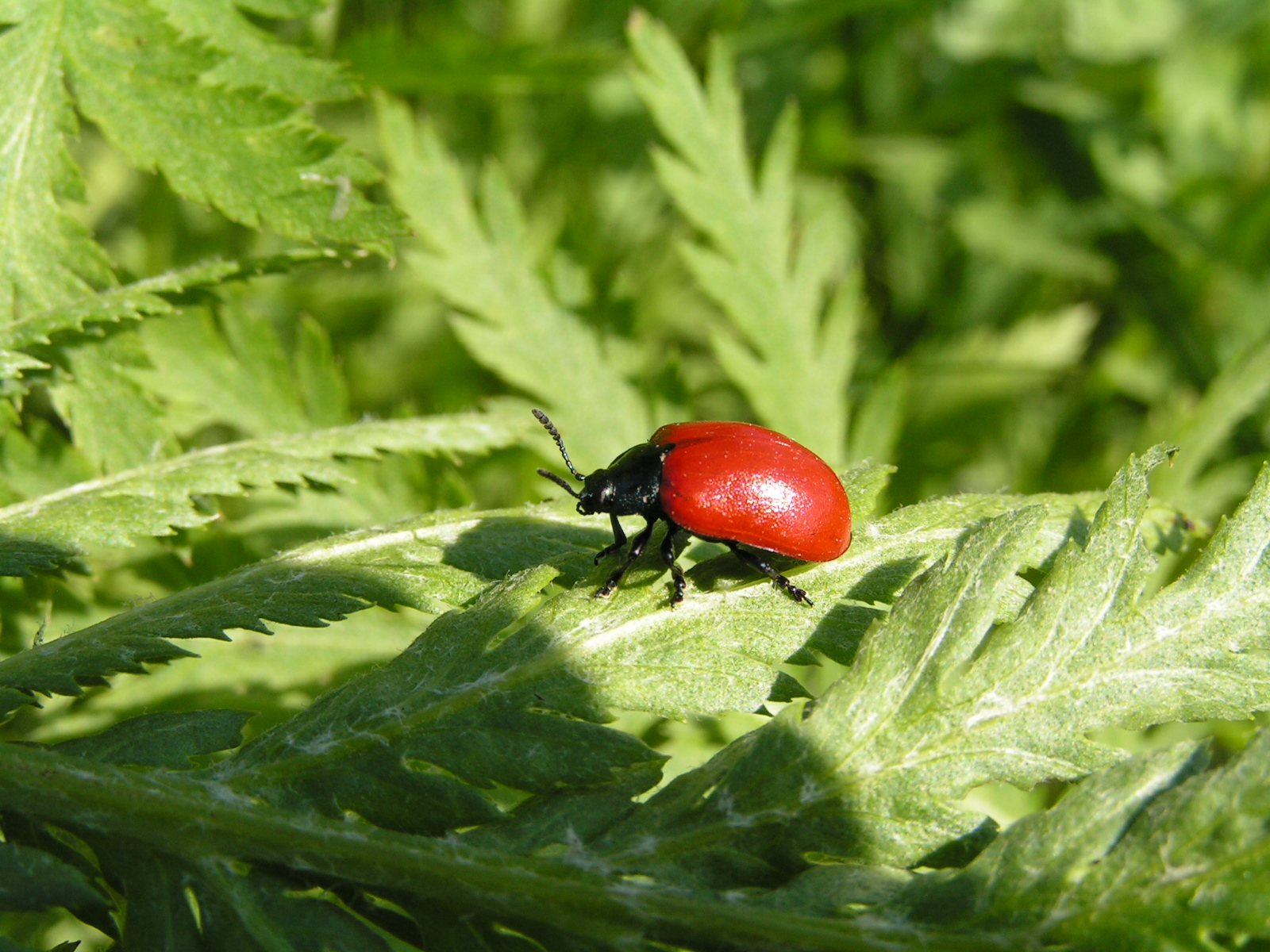
Chrysomela populi

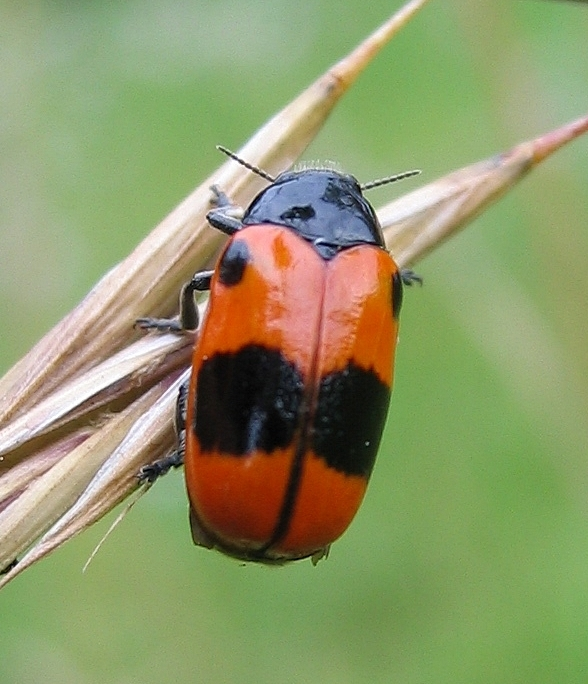
Clytra laeviuscula

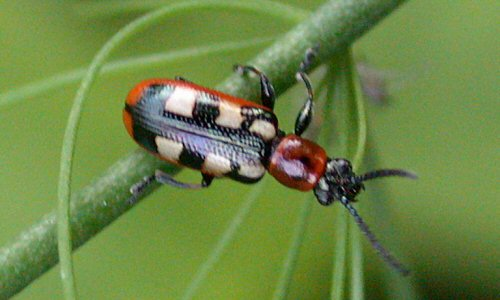
Crioceris asparagi

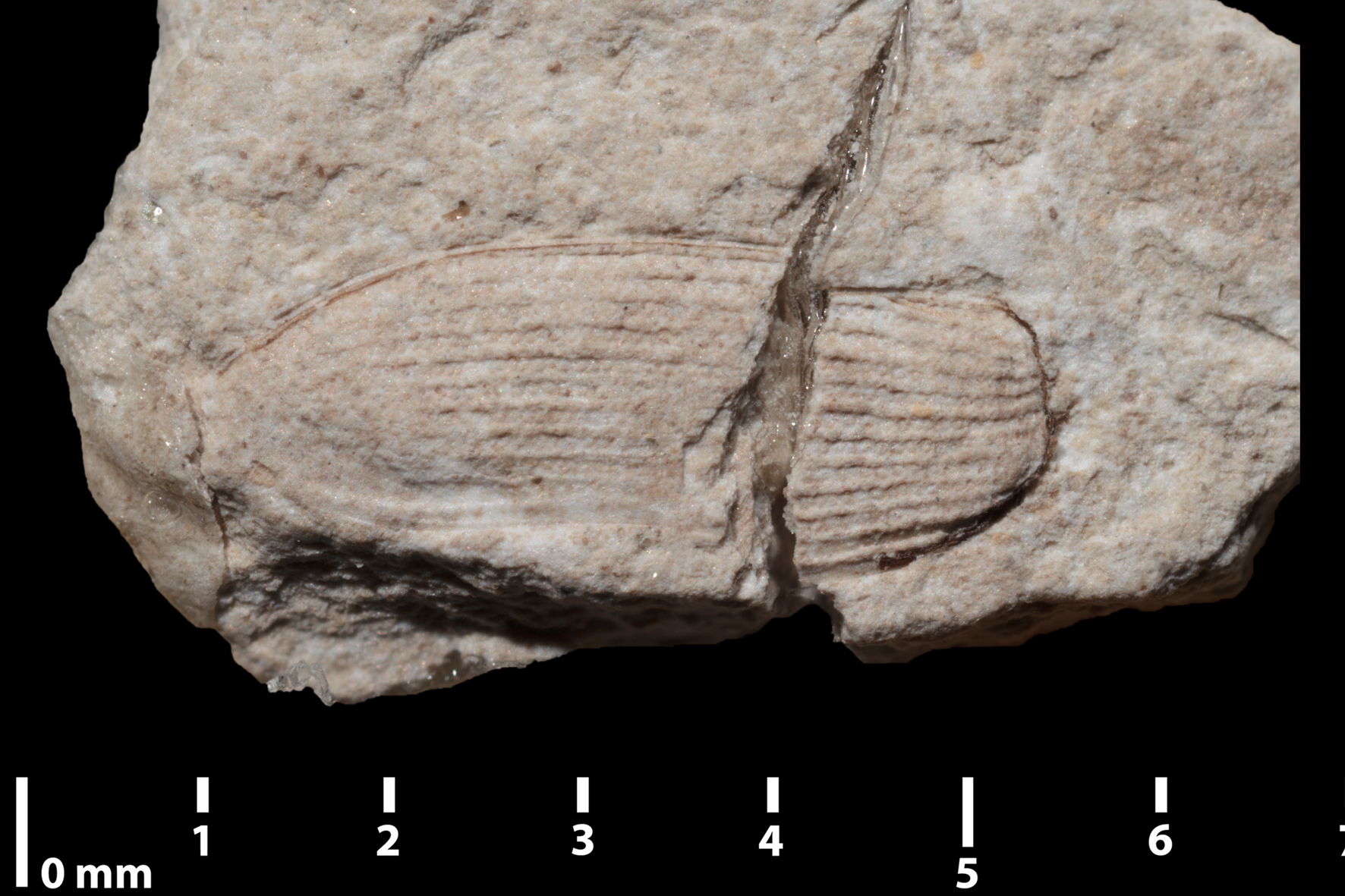
Donacia splendida, fossil

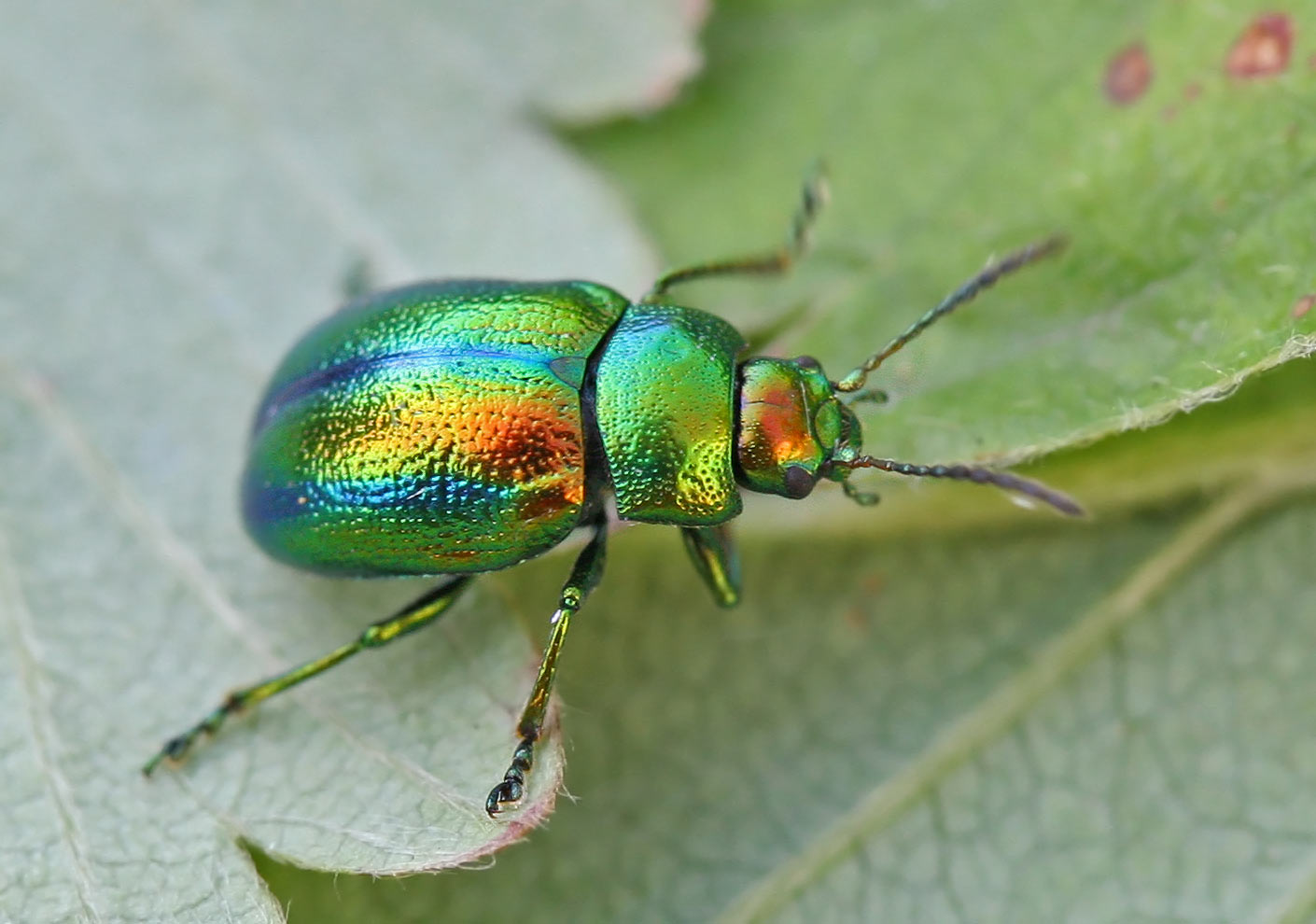
Fasta fastuosa

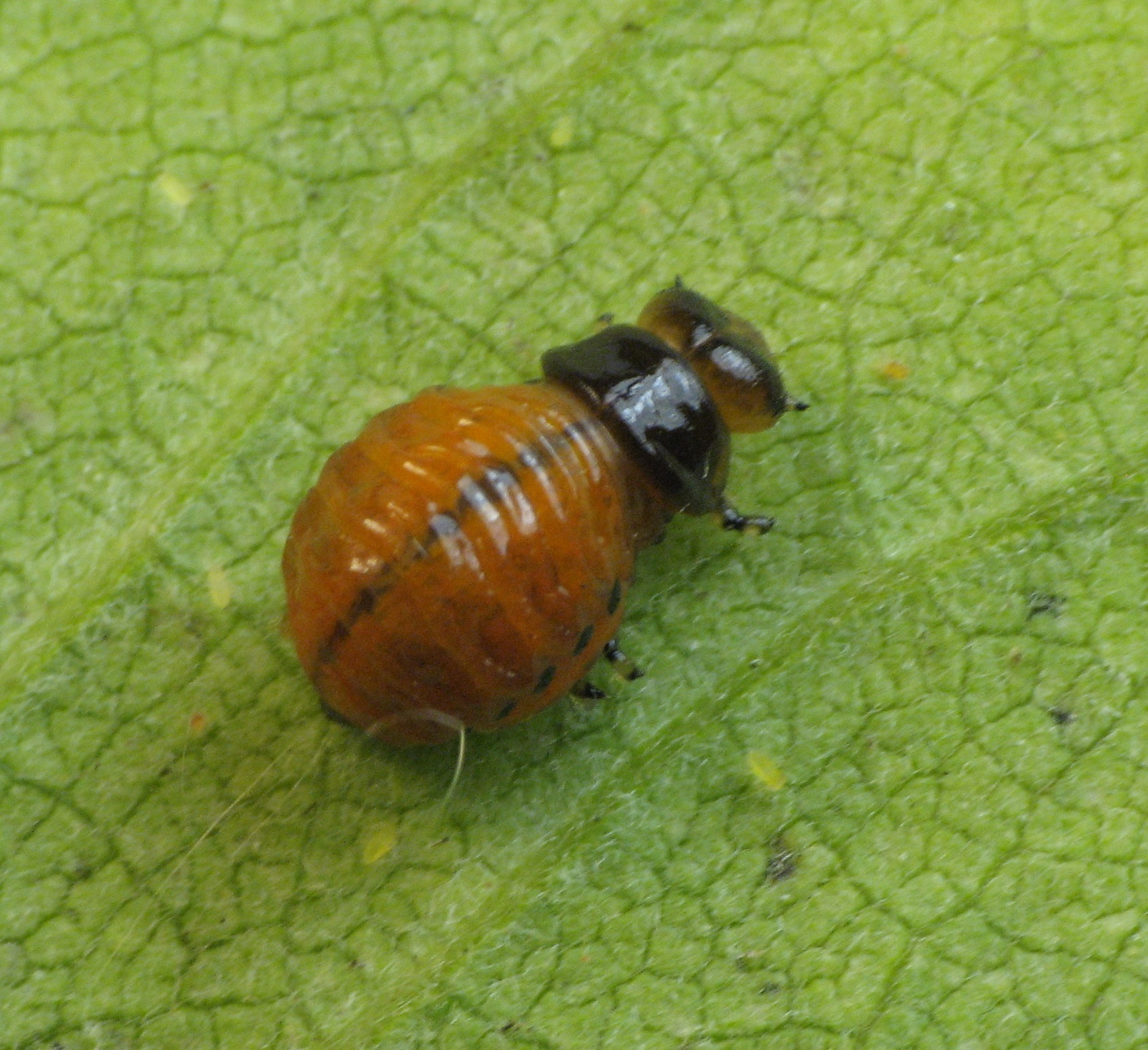
Labidomera clivicollis, larva

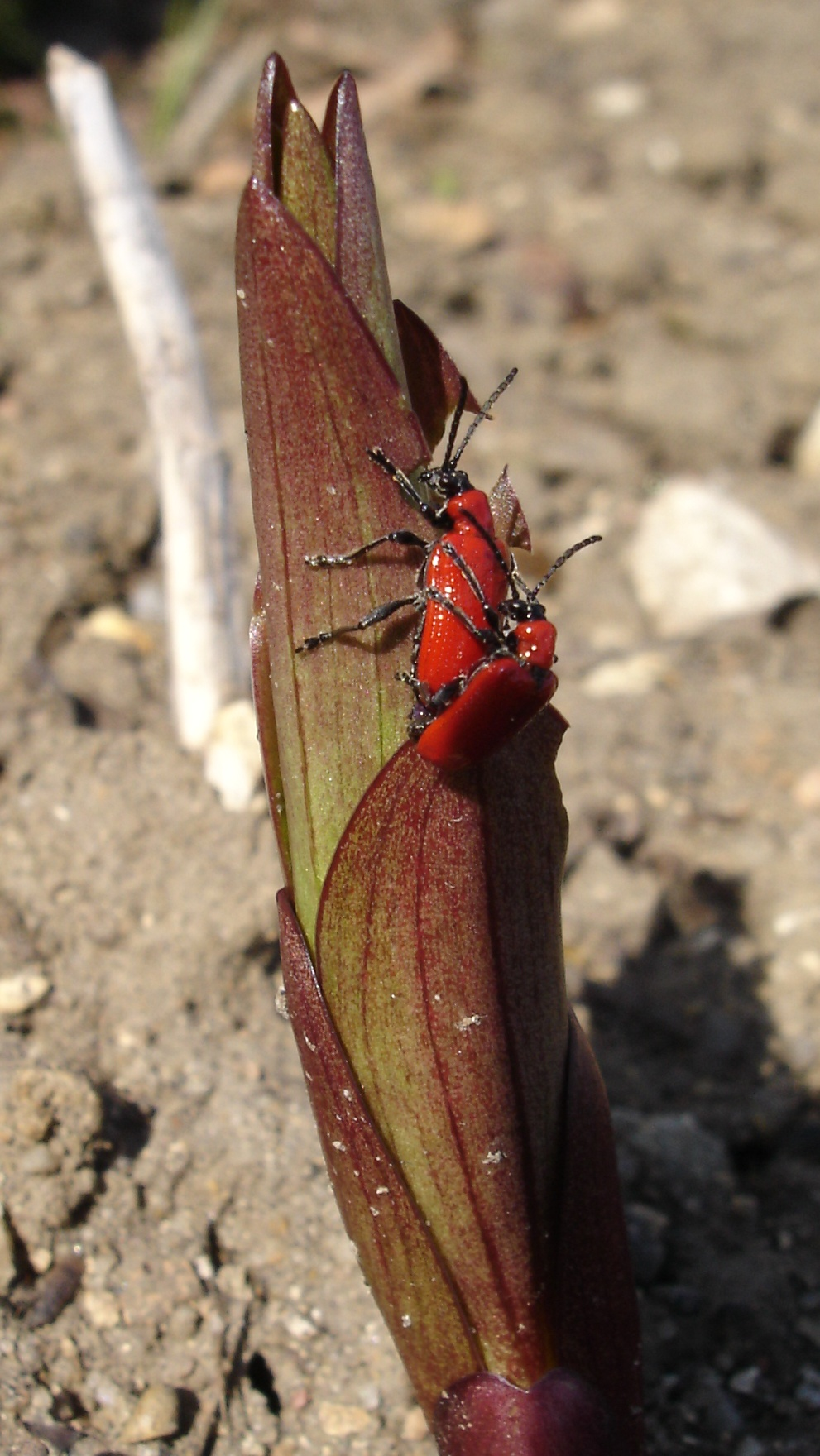
Lilioceris lilii

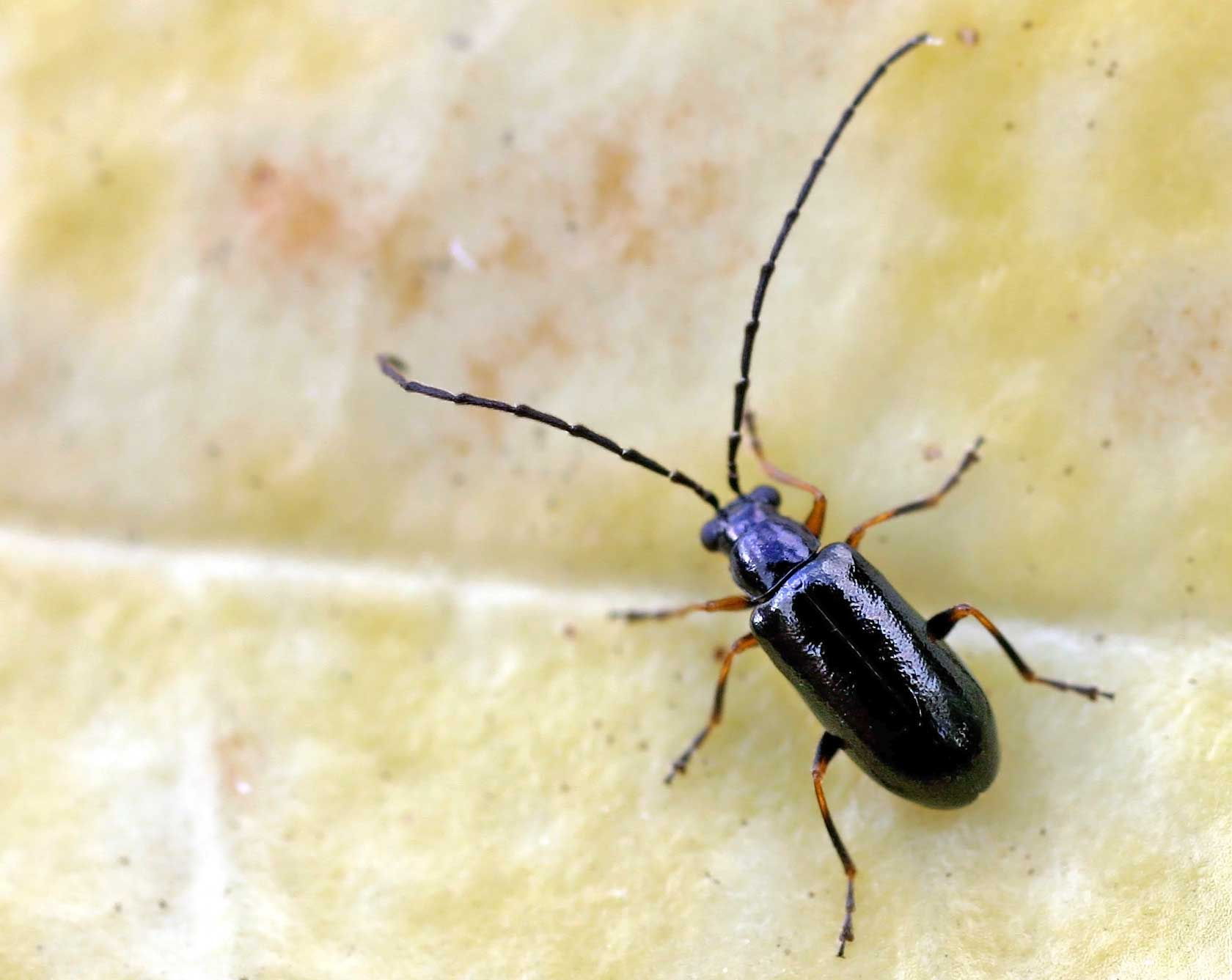
Luperus longicornis

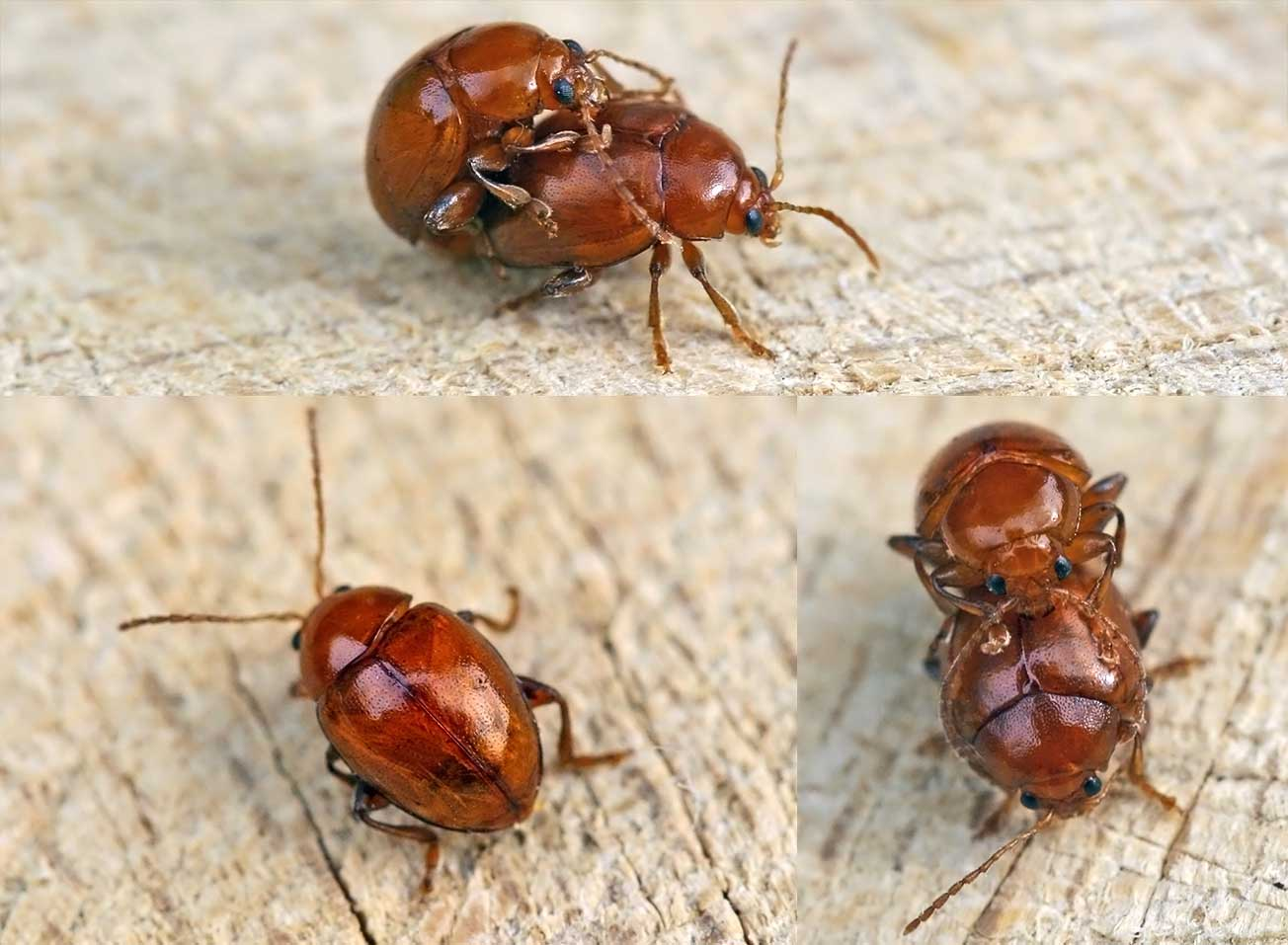
Sphaeroderma rubidum

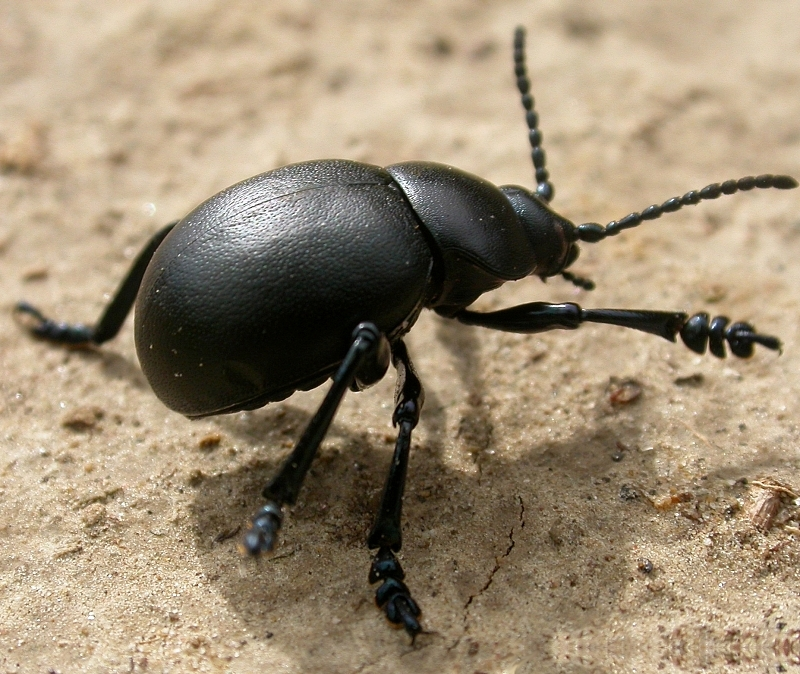
Timarcha sp.

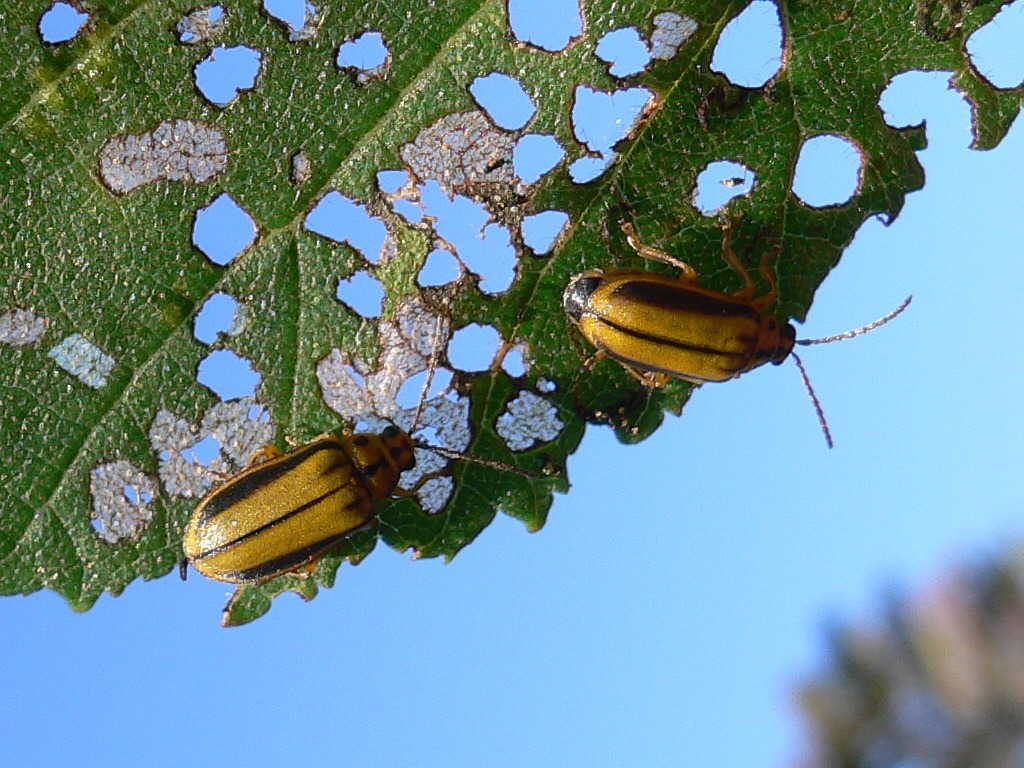
Xanthogaleruca luteola

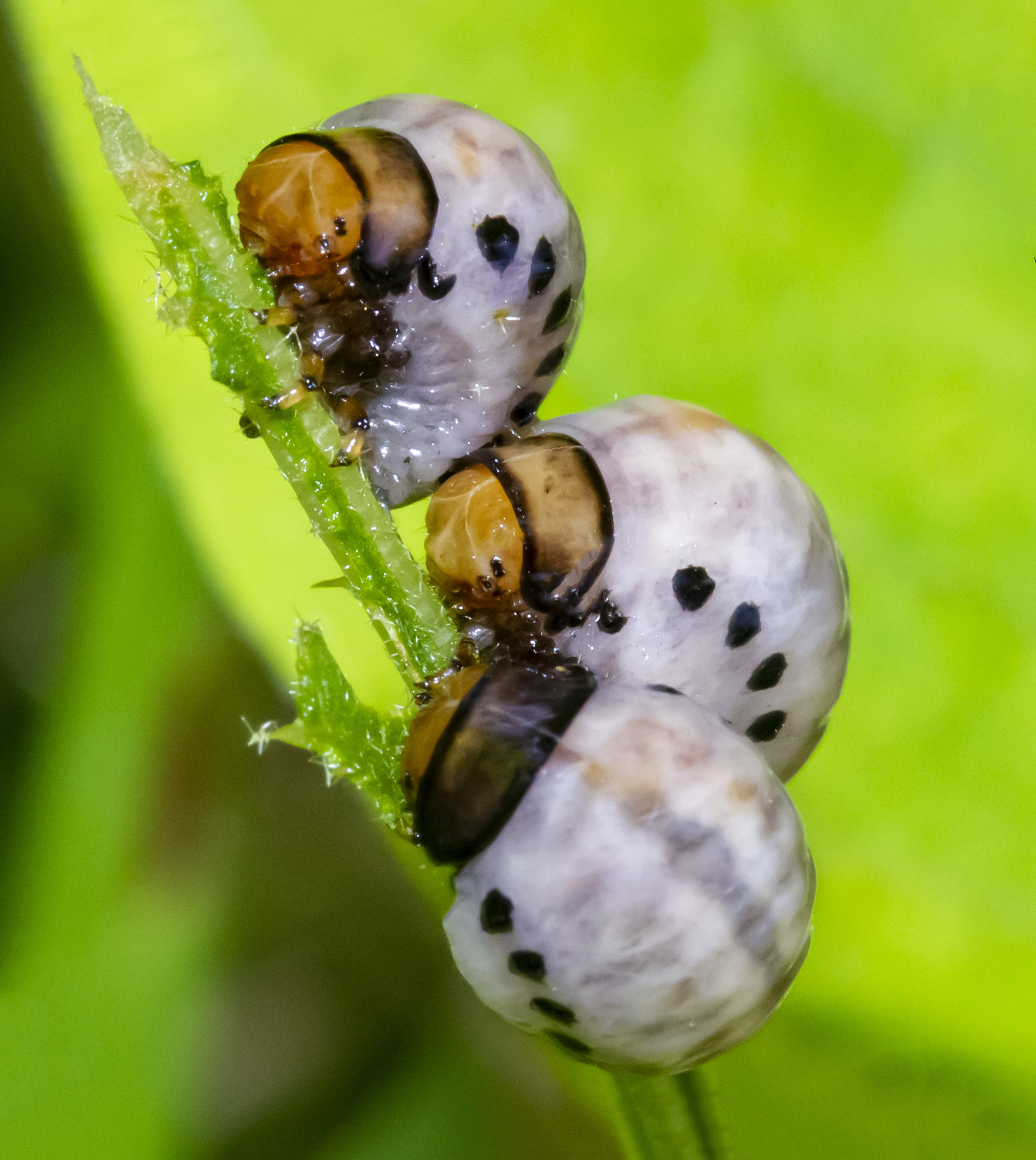
Several Chrysomelidae spp. larvae feeding on undefined host plant

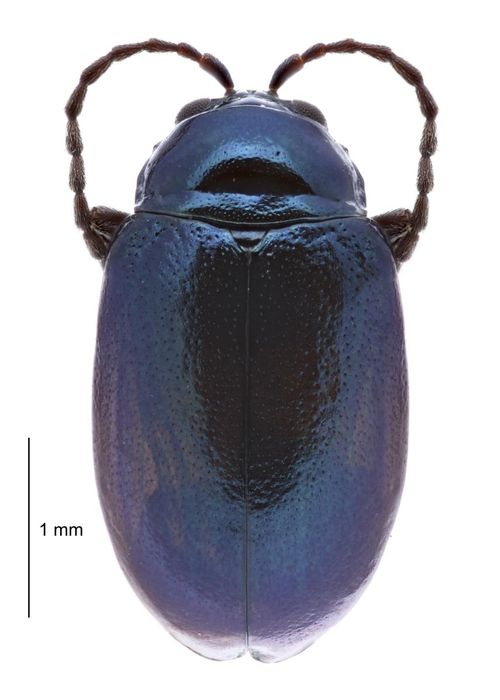
Altica cirsicola

Aulacophora nigripennis flying away in Japan

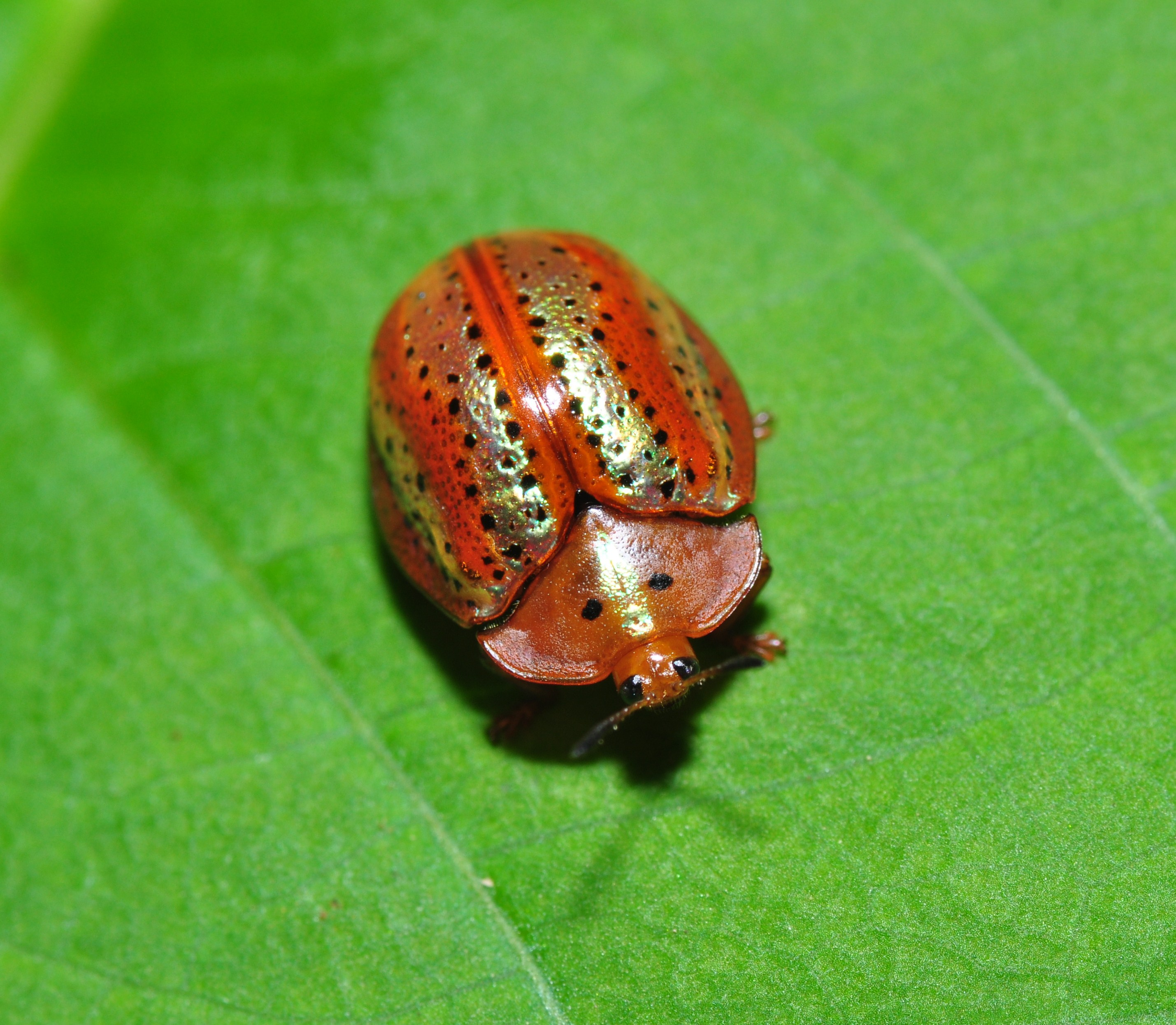
Chelymorpha alternans

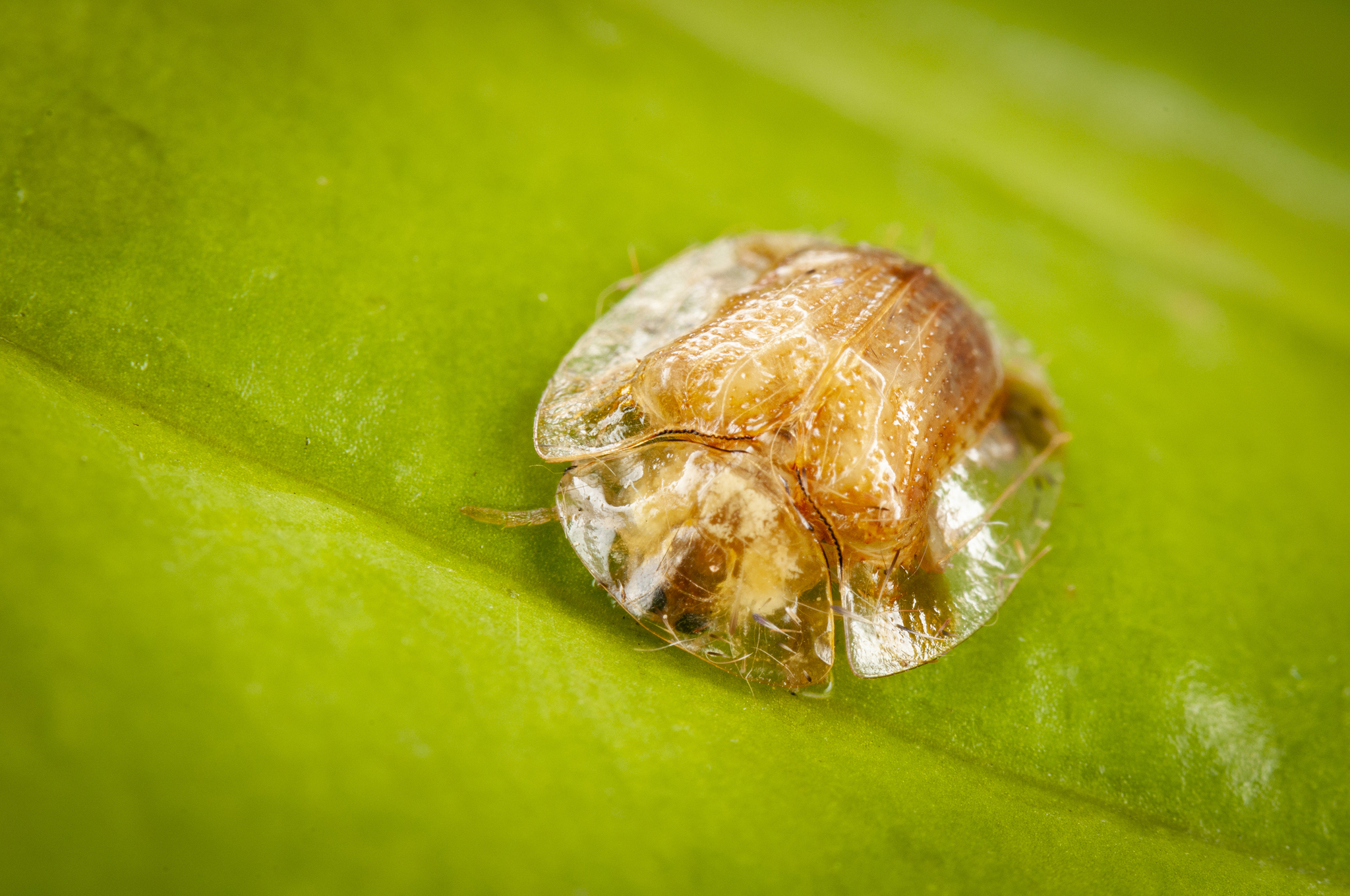
Thlaspida lewisii

== Bibliography ==
- Löbl, Ivan; Smetana, Ales, eds. (2010). "Chrysomelidae". Chrysomeloidea. Catalogue of Palaearctic Coleoptera. Vol. 6. Brill. pp. 337–643. ISBN 978-90-04-26091-7.
- Riley, Edward G.; Clark, Shawn M.; Seeno, Terry N. (2003). Catalog of the leaf beetles of America north of Mexico (Coleoptera: Megalopodidae, Orsodacnidae and Chrysomelidae, excluding Bruchinae). Special Publication. Vol. 1. Sacramento, CA: The Coleopterists Society. ISBN 0-9726087-1-0.
