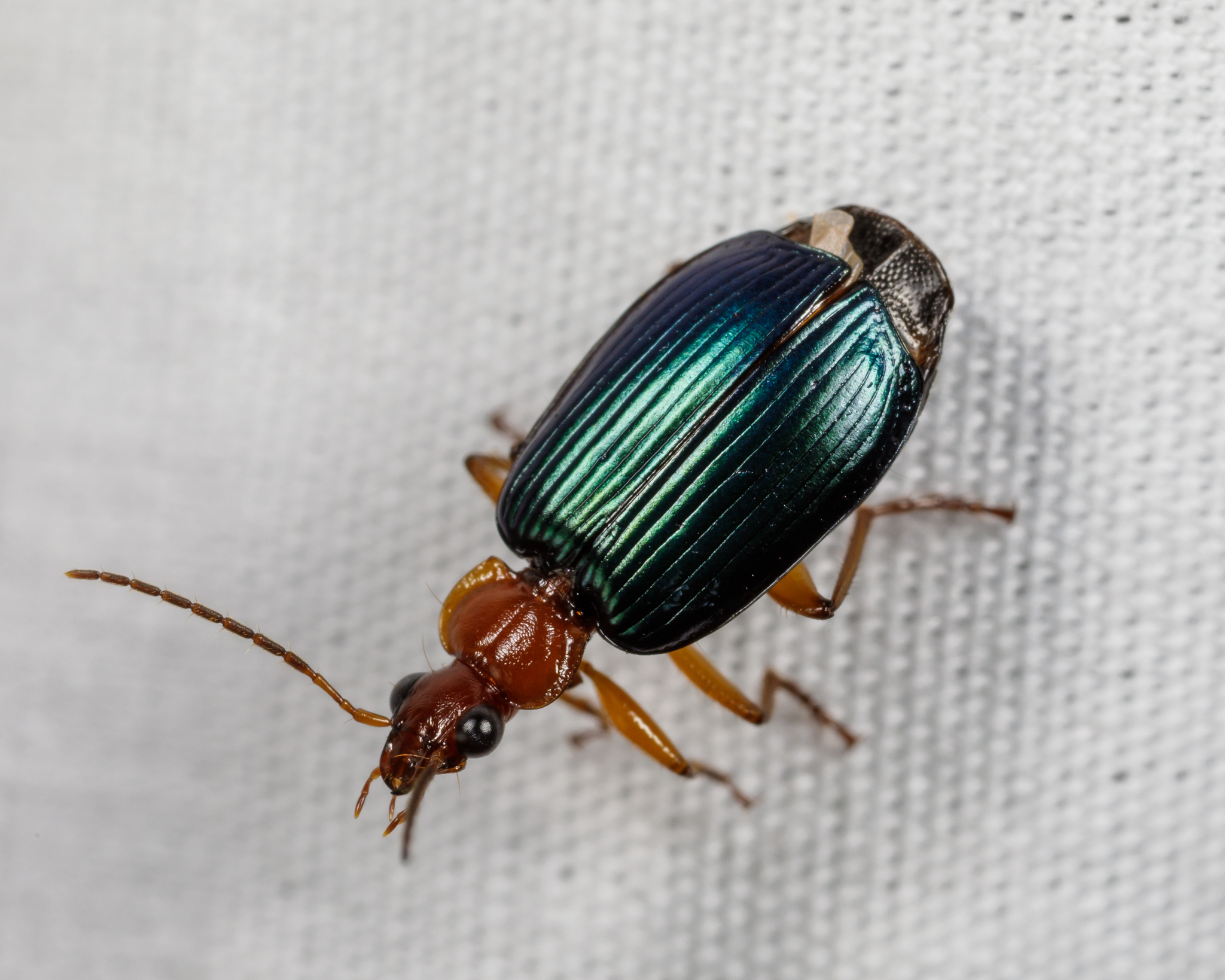
- L. grandis

Scientific classification
- Kingdom: Animalia
- Phylum: Arthropoda
- Class: Insecta
- Order: Coleoptera
- Suborder: Adephaga
- Family: Carabidae
- Genus: Lebia
- Species: L. grandis

Binomial name
- Lebia grandis Say, 1823

= Lebia grandis =

Species of beetle

Lebia grandis is a ground beetle in the family Carabidae found in North America. It is a specialist predator on the eggs and larvae of Colorado potato beetles, and its larvae are obligate parasitoids of Colorado potato beetle pupae.

== Description ==
Lebia grandis is the largest species in its genus found in North America. It is about one centimetre long with a rusty orange head, thorax and legs, a black abdomen and an iridescent blue or purple lustre to the dark coloured elytra. These are wide but rather shorter than the abdomen which protrudes posteriorly.

== Life cycle ==
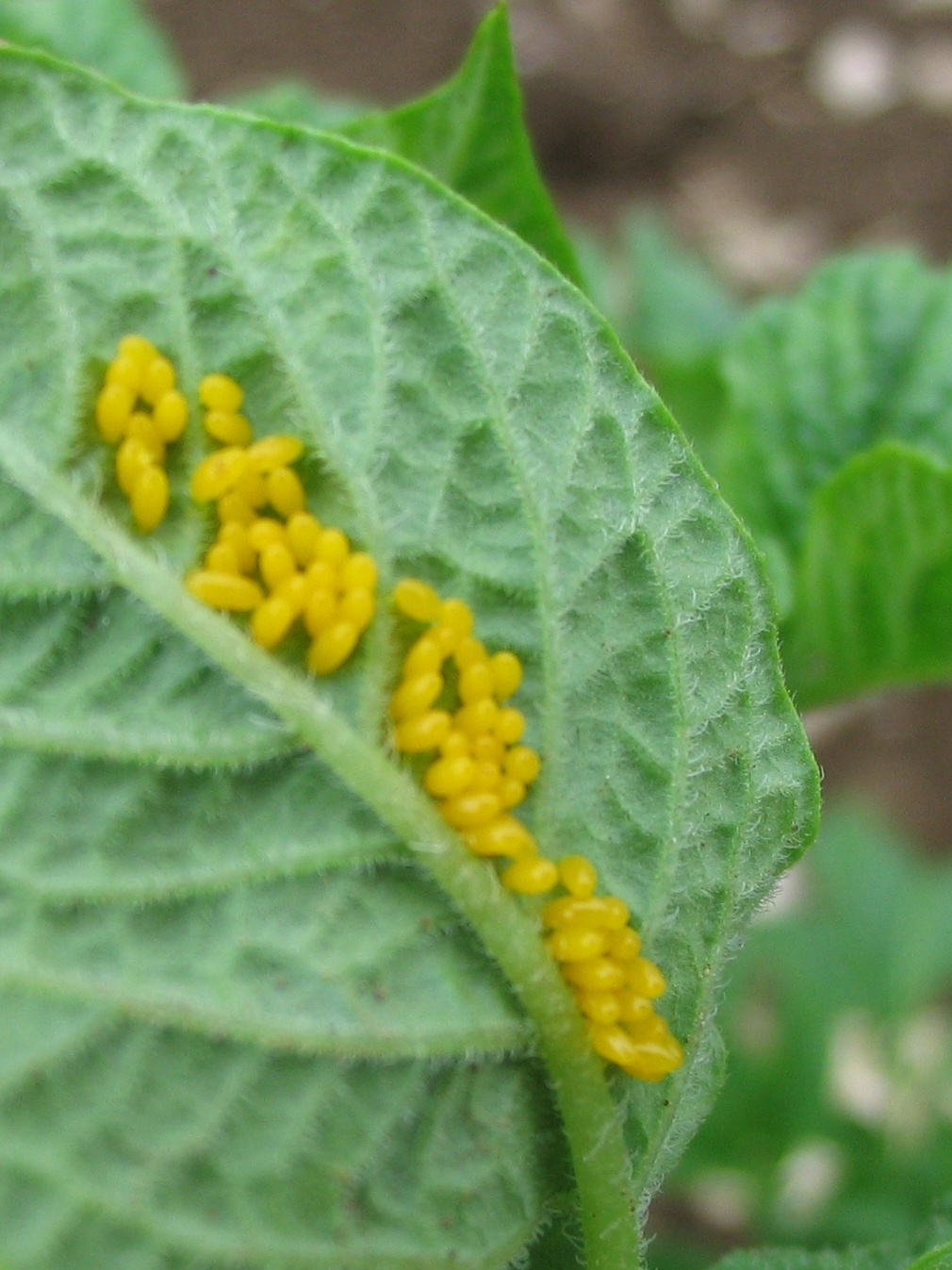
23 of these Colorado beetle eggs may be eaten each day by a single adult Lebia grandis.

Adult Lebia grandis ground beetles overwinter in soil in or near potato fields. In the spring Colorado potato beetles emerge from hibernation. By the time Lebia grandis beetles emerge a few weeks later, there are eggs and young larvae of their prey for them to eat and suitable pupae will soon be available for their larvae to attack. An adult beetle can eat about twenty three eggs or three third instar larvae of the Colorado potato beetle each day. After mating, the females lay eggs singly in the soil near potato plants. A glandular secretion causes soil granules to stick to the eggs which serves to camouflage them. Each female can lay up to 1300 eggs over the course of a few months.

The eggs hatch after about two weeks and the first instar larvae search out Colorado potato beetle larvae that are about to pupate. They may follow an odour trail left behind by the burrowing larvae and they need to reach the pupation chamber before it is sealed. They sink their mandibles into the integument of their hosts and start feeding, killing the host in the process. After moulting they cease feeding and soon metamorphose into the pupal stage. Adult ground beetles emerge about three weeks after the eggs were hatched.

== Use in biological control ==
The significance of Lebia grandis in keeping Colorado Potato Beetle under control was not originally fully appreciated because of the largely nocturnal habits of the adult beetles and the subterranean existence of the larvae. In fact it was about a hundred years after its first description as a species that the larvae were discovered to have a parasitoid habit.

Because it specifically targets Colorado potato beetles and is native to North America, Lebia grandis shows promise as a biological control species in the United States. However it does not usually occur in sufficient numbers to effect complete control. Populations may need to be augmented by releasing adult beetles but rearing these in bulk presents certain difficulties that have not yet been overcome. Other predators such as the spotted lady beetle (Coleomegilla maculata) also prey on Colorado potato beetles but Lebia grandis is constrained by its chrysomelid larval host to habituate potato fields while other predators may disperse to other sources of food.

== Research ==
The historical records for Lebia grandis show that it was present in areas where Leptinotarsa decemlineata was not found. This would seem to imply that at one time it parasitized a different species.

The original host plant of the Colorado potato beetle, Leptinotarsa decemlineata was the buffalo bur, Solanum rostratum, in Mexico. No association has been found between Lebia grandis and Leptinotarsa decemlineata on this host plant. In the 1850s, Leptinotarsa decemlineata began to feed on the potato plant and spread rapidly eastwards on potato crops. Lebia grandis may have had a relationship prior to this with the false potato beetle, Leptinotarsa juncta which feeds on horsenettle, Solanum carolinense. Another closely related chrysomid beetle, Leptinotarsa haldemani is recorded from Texas, Oklahoma, Arizona and Mexico, where it lives on wild species of Physalis and Solanum douglasii, but its range does not overlap with Lebia grandis except possibly in Texas.

In an attempt to find the original species associated with Lebia grandis, research was undertaken examining its prey preferences and the suitability of the three chrysomelid species, L. decemlineata, L. juncta and L. haldemani as hosts for its larvae.

Adult Lebia grandis beetles were offered suitable sized larvae of these three chrysomelid species and the number of larvae of each species that were eaten was noted. A similar experiment was performed using the eggs of the three chrysomelid species. The Lebia grandis adults showed no significant difference in the number of larvae of each prey species they chose to eat, but they did differentiate between their eggs. L. juncta egg consumption averaged nearly twice as high as L. decemlineata egg consumption, with L. haldemani being in an intermediate position.

In another experiment, a first instar larva of Lebia grandis was placed in close proximity to a 4th instar chrysomelid larva that was about to pupate. The success rate of parasitism in each of the three prey species was noted. Successful development of Lebia grandis from first instar larva to adult occurred with each of the three species of Leptinotarsa. However the success rate recorded for L. juncta was about 43% as compared to 12% for the other two species.

These studies would seem to support the view that Lebia grandis was originally exclusively a parasitoid of L. juncta, but that the opportunity afforded by its encounter with L. decemlineata less than 150 years ago enabled it to exploit this new and abundant food source.
