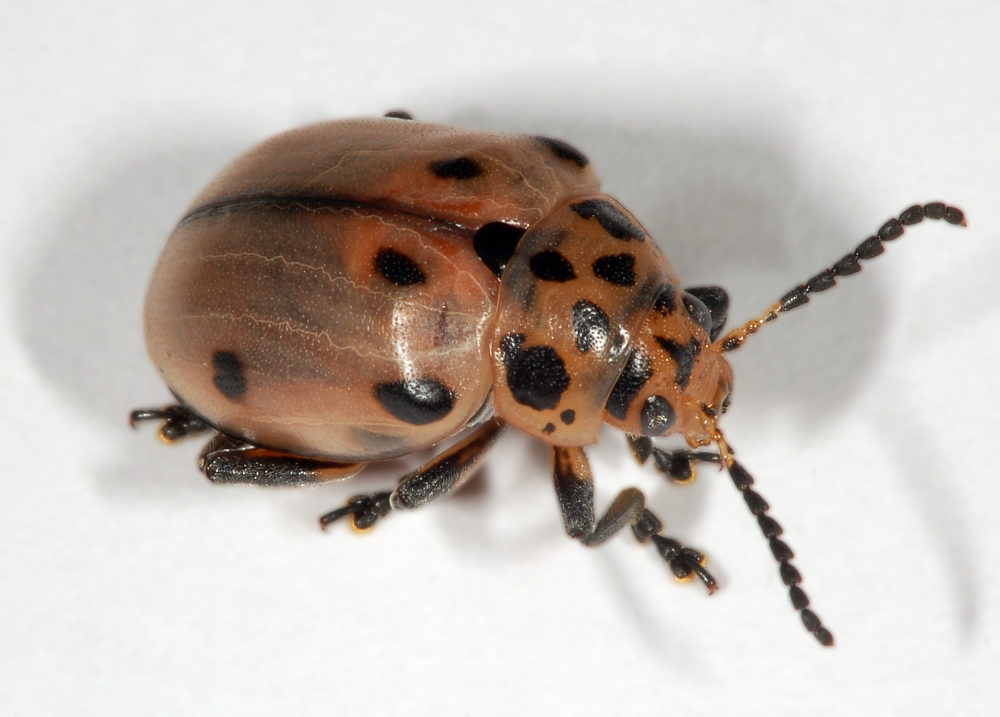

Scientific classification
- Kingdom: Animalia
- Phylum: Arthropoda
- Clade: Pancrustacea
- Class: Insecta
- Order: Coleoptera
- Suborder: Polyphaga
- Infraorder: Cucujiformia
- Family: Chrysomelidae
- Genus: Diamphidia
- Species: D. nigroornata

Binomial name
- Diamphidia nigroornata Stål, 1858

= Diamphidia nigroornata =

Species of beetle

Diamphidia nigroornata, or Bushman arrow-poison beetle, is an African leaf beetle species in the genus Diamphidia.

The larvae and pupae of Diamphidia produce a toxin used by San people as an arrow poison. The Finnish explorer Hendrik Jacob Wikar, who travelled in Southern Africa in 1773–1779, described the larvae as "poisonous worms". Hans Schinz was the first scientist to document the process by which the San people extract and use the poison.

The adults and larvae of Diamphidia nigroornata feed on Commiphora angolensis.

== Life cycle ==
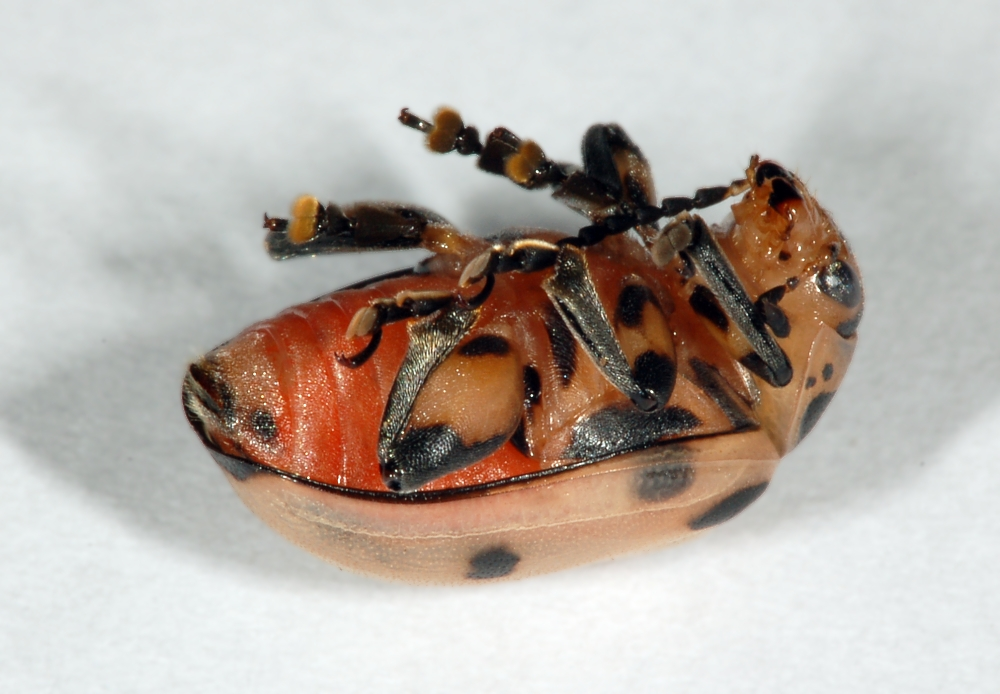
Diamphidia nigroornata

Adult females of Diamphidia nigroornata lay their eggs on the stems of Commiphora species and coat the eggs with their faeces which harden into a protective covering. As the larval instars develop, the pellets of their own faeces remain attached to their backs and posteriors. The final instar sheds this faecal coat when entering the soil to pupate. The Diamphidia larvae burrow down for a depth of up to 1 metre in the sand under the food plant, where they may lie dormant for several years before going through a very rapid pupal phase.

== Toxin ==
Diamphotoxin, the poisonous compound in Diamphidia, is highly labile, and has a low molecular weight. It is bound to a protein that protects it from deactivation. It causes an increased permeability of cell membranes, which, while not affecting normal ionic flow between cells, allows easy access to all small ions, thereby fatally disrupting normal cellular ionic levels. Although it has no neurotoxic effect, it produces a lethal haemolytic effect, and may reduce haemoglobin levels by as much as 75%, leading to haemoglobinuria.

== Parasite host ==
Diamphidia is parasitised by a carabid Lebistina beetle, the larva of which attaches itself to a mature Diamphidia larva, clinging to it until the Diamphidia has formed its cocoon, enclosing both host and parasite, and then feeding on its host's soft tissue. The Lebistina larvae are more toxic than their hosts and are preferred by San hunters for arrow poison.

== Gallery ==
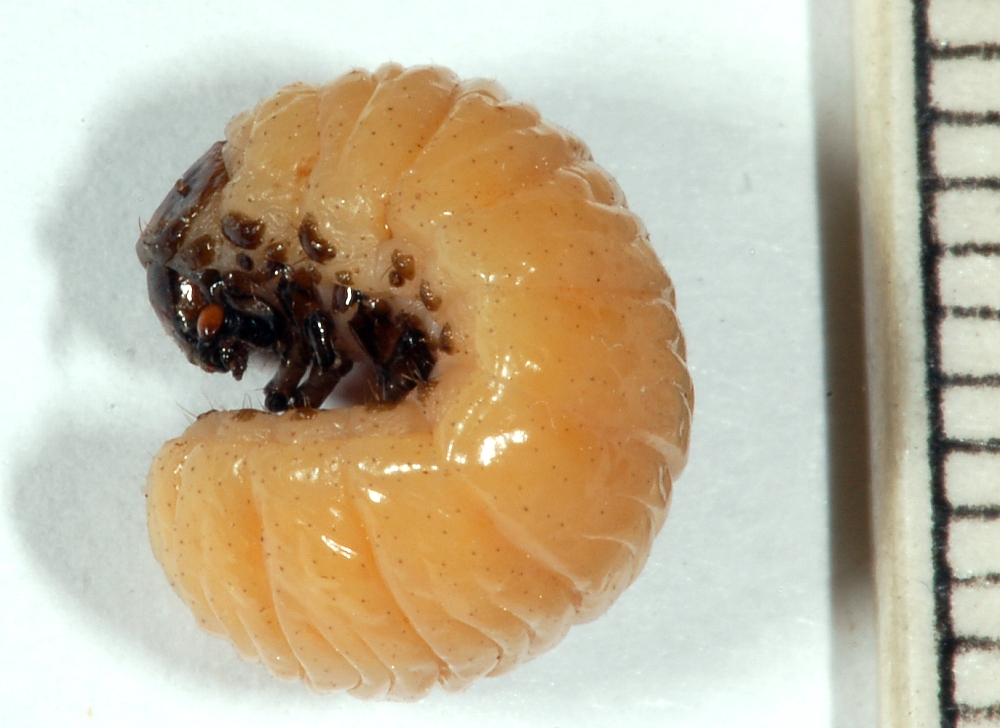
Diamphidia nigroornata larva

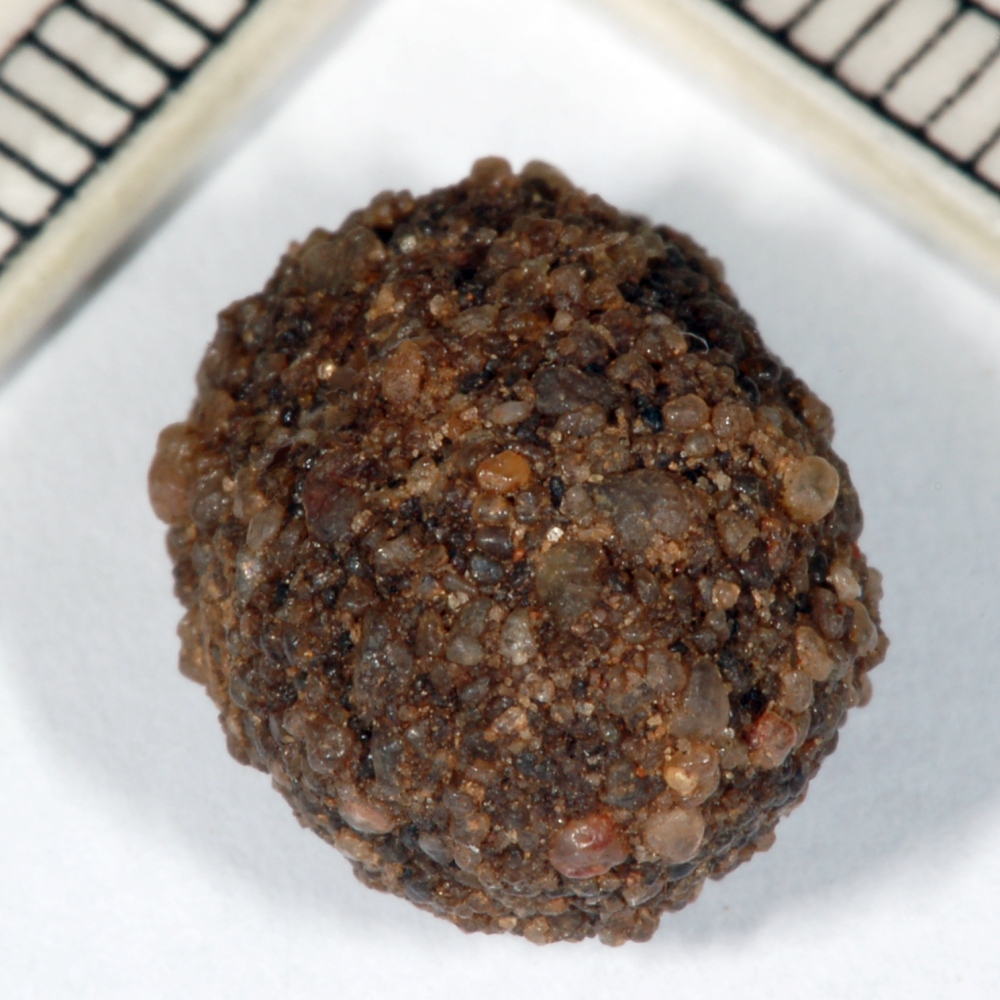
Diamphidia nigroornata cocoon
