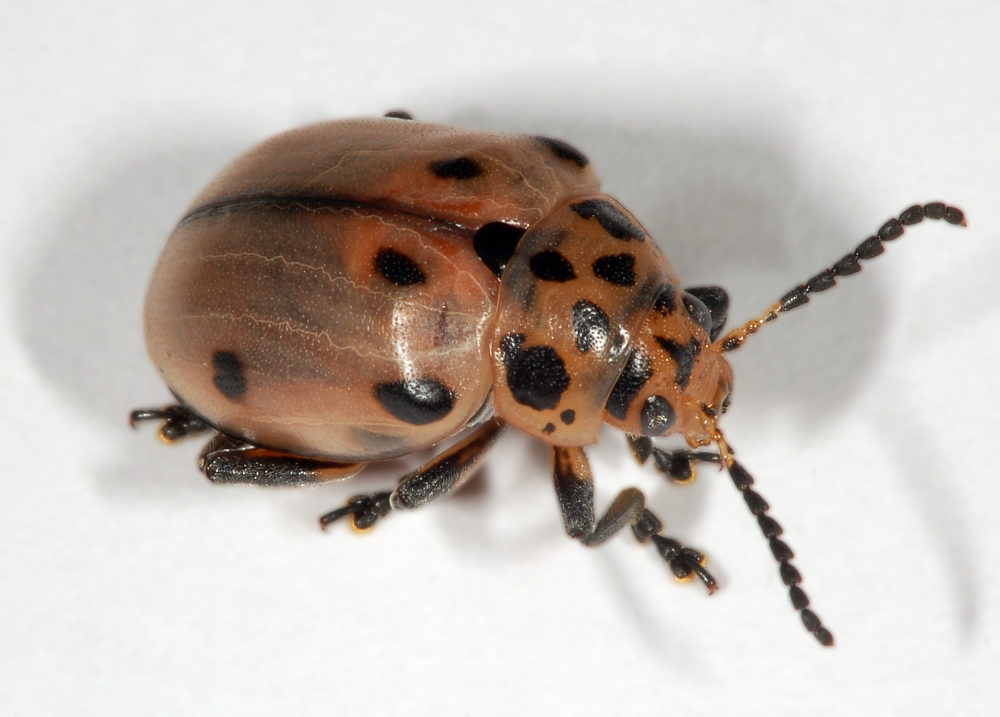
- Bushman arrow-poison beetle (Diamphidia nigroornata)
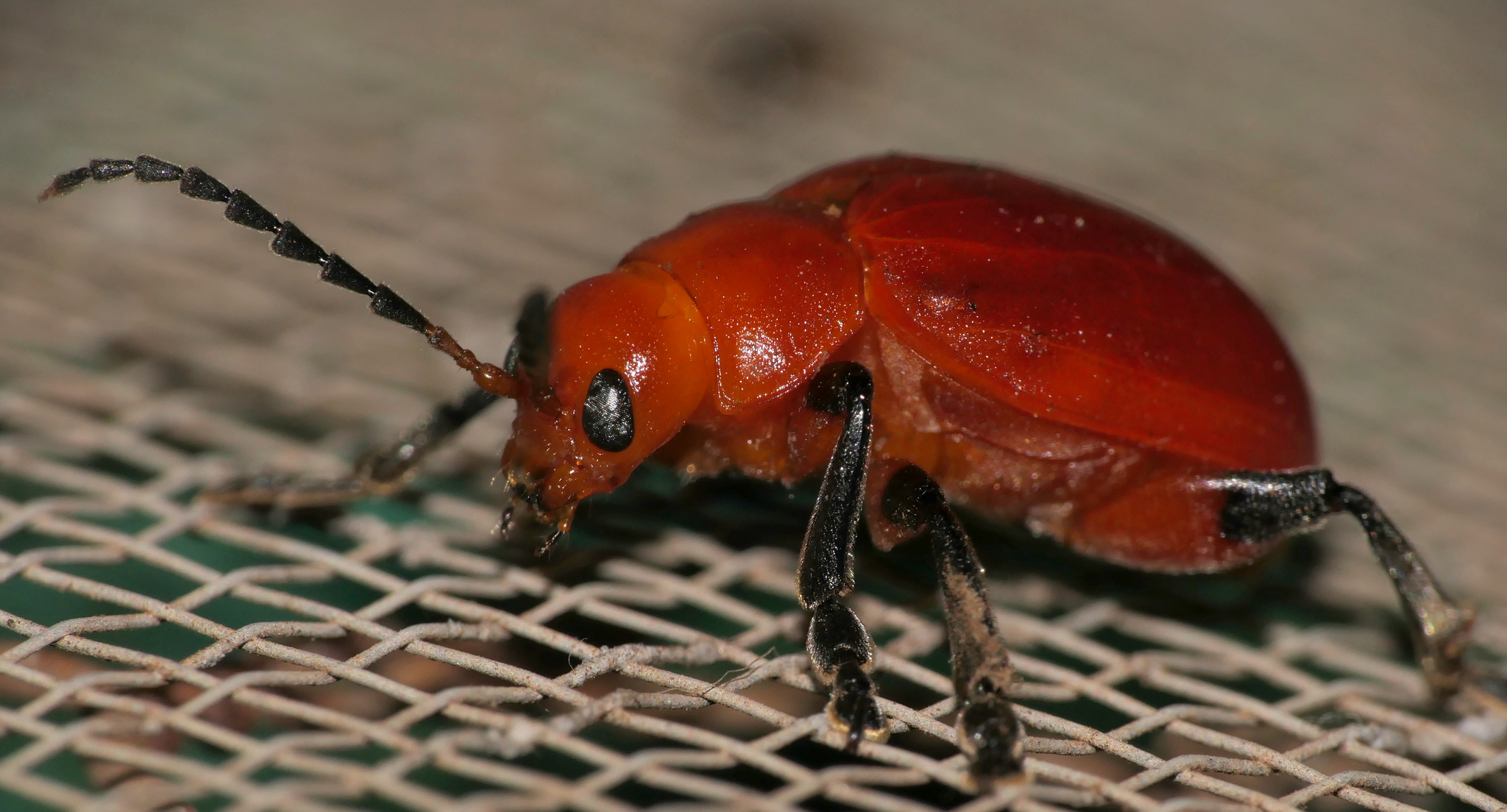
- Diamphidia femoralis

Scientific classification
- Kingdom: Animalia
- Phylum: Arthropoda
- Clade: Pancrustacea
- Class: Insecta
- Order: Coleoptera
- Suborder: Polyphaga
- Infraorder: Cucujiformia
- Family: Chrysomelidae
- Genus: Diamphidia; Gerstaecker, 1855

Species
- Diamphidia femoralis Gerstaecker, 1855; Diamphidia nigroornata (Stål, 1858); Diamphidia vittatipennis

= Diamphidia =

Genus of beetles

Diamphidia, or Bushman arrow-poison beetle, is an African genus of flea beetles, in the family Chrysomelidae.

The larvae and pupae of Diamphidia produce a toxin used by Bushmen as an arrow poison. The Finnish explorer Hendrik Jacob Wikar, who travelled in Southern Africa in 1773–1779, described the larvae as "poisonous worms". Hans Schinz was the first scientist to document the process by which the Bushmen extract and use the poison.

The adults and larvae of Diamphidia nigroornata feed on Commiphora angolensis (Engler), whereas Diamphidia vittatipennis eat African myrrh.

== Life cycle ==
Adult females of Diamphidia femoralis Gerstaecker and Diamphidia nigroornata (Stål) lay their eggs on the stems of Commiphora species and coat the eggs with their faeces which hardens into a protective covering. As the larval instars develop, the pellets of their own faeces remain attached to their backs and posteriors. The final instar sheds this faecal coat when entering the soil to pupate. The same behaviour is found in Blepharida, a flea beetle and Polyclada, the African leaf beetle. The Diamphidia larvae burrow down for a depth of up to 1 metre in the sand under the food plant, where they may lie dormant for several years before going through a very rapid pupal phase.

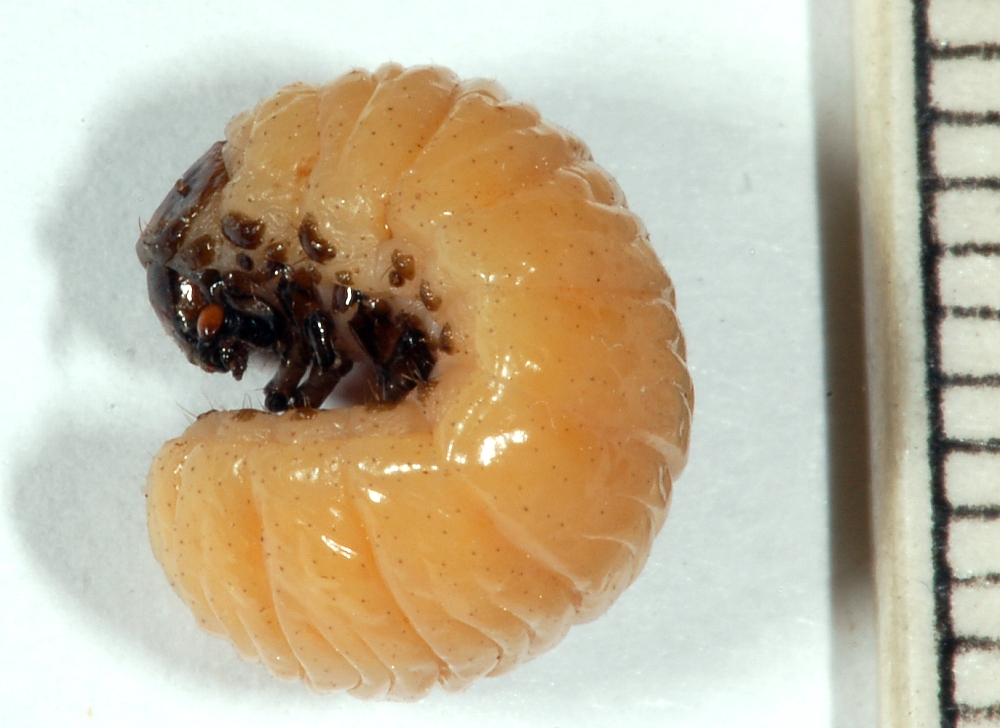
D. nigroornata larva

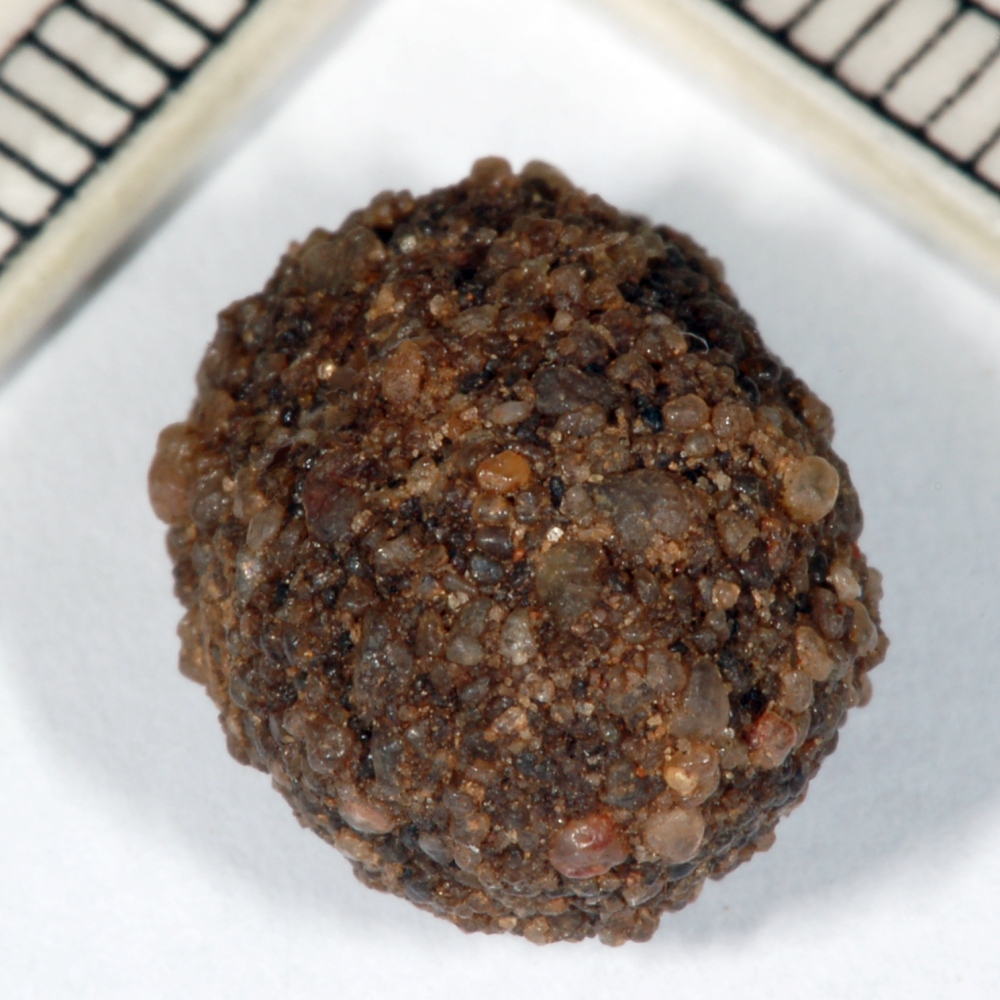
D. nigroornata sand cocoon

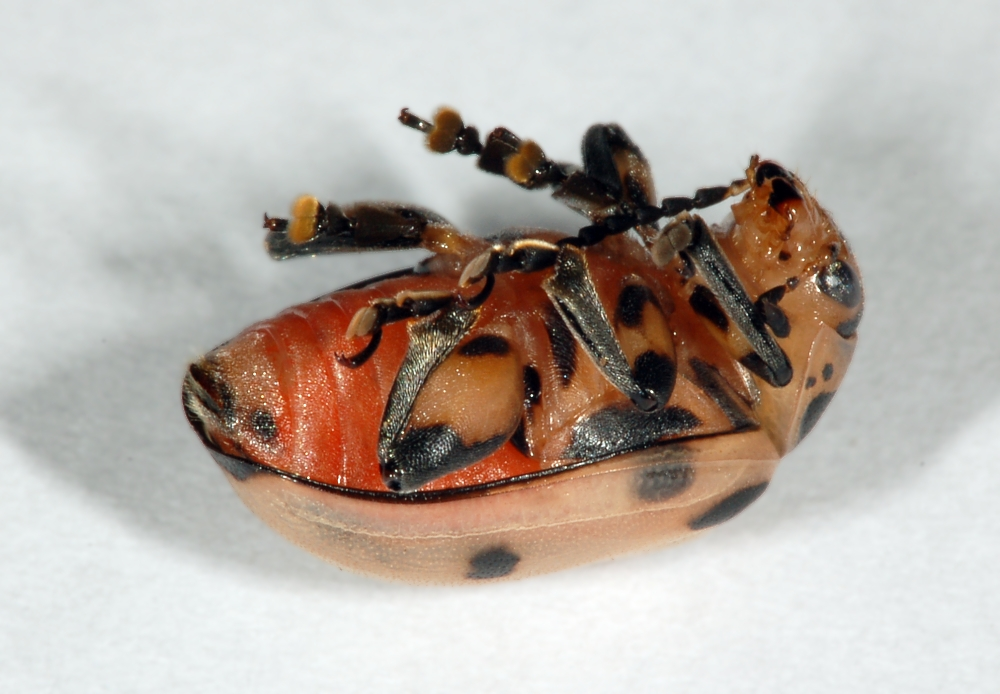
D. nigroornata adult

== Toxin ==
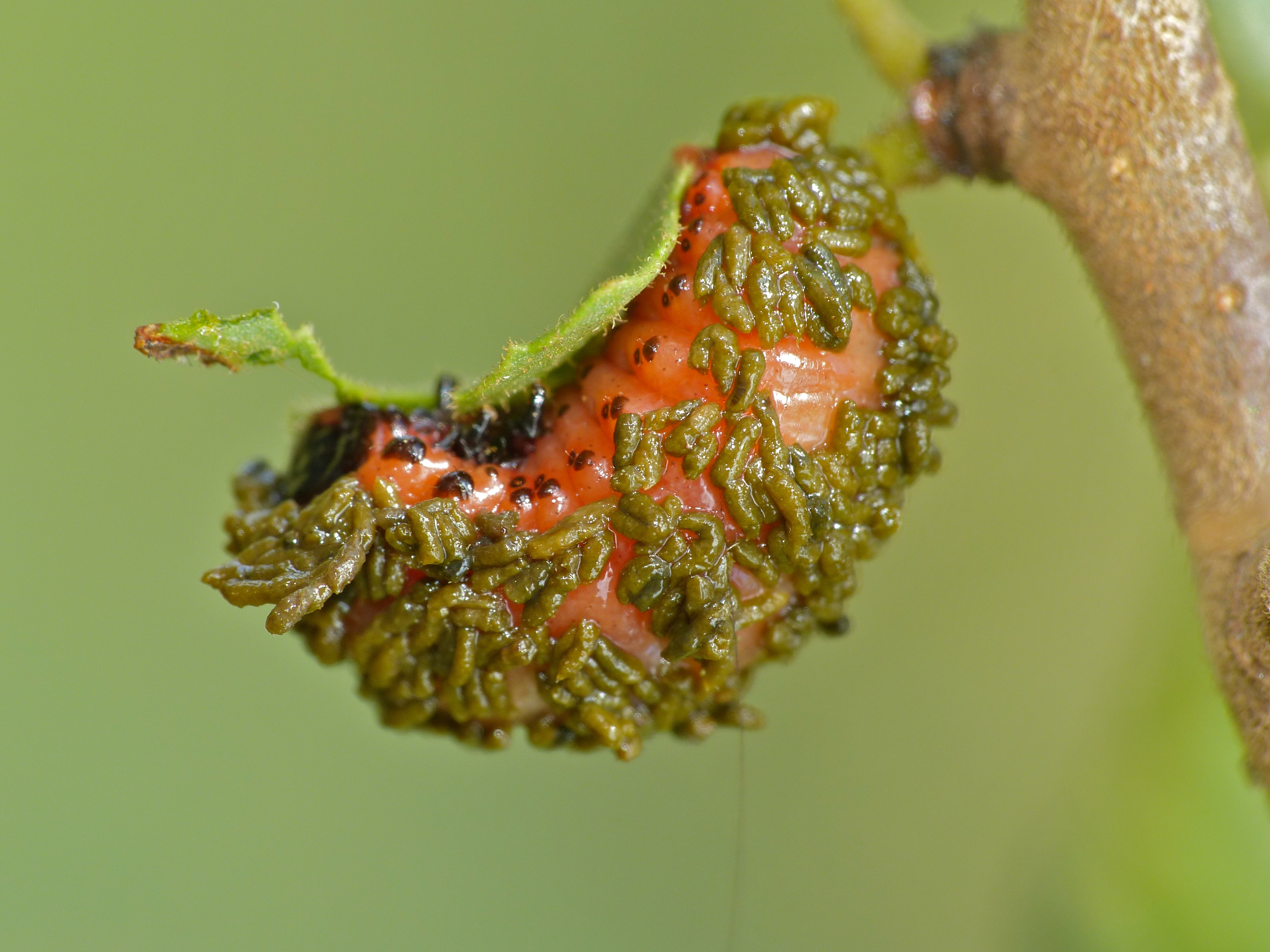
Diamphidia vittatipennis larva covered in its own faeces, South Africa

Diamphotoxin, the toxic compound in Diamphidia, is highly labile, and has a low molecular weight. It is bound to a protein that protects it from deactivation. It causes an increased permeability of cell membranes, which, while not affecting normal ionic flow between cells, allows easy access to all small ions, thereby fatally disrupting normal cellular ionic levels. Although it has no neurotoxic effect, it produces a lethal haemolytic effect, and may reduce haemoglobin levels by as much as 75%, leading to haemoglobinuria.

Diamphotoxin is only toxic to mammals when injected into the bloodstream, not when ingested, making it unclear how it protects the larvae. It has been hypothesized that the toxin may be harmful on ingestion for non-mammal species.

== Parasite host ==
Diamphidia is parasitised by a carabid Lebistina beetle, the larva of which attaches itself to a mature Diamphidia larva, clinging to it until the Diamphidia has formed its cocoon, enclosing both host and parasite, and then feeding on its host's soft tissue. The Lebistina larvae are more toxic than their hosts and are preferred by San hunters for arrow poison.
