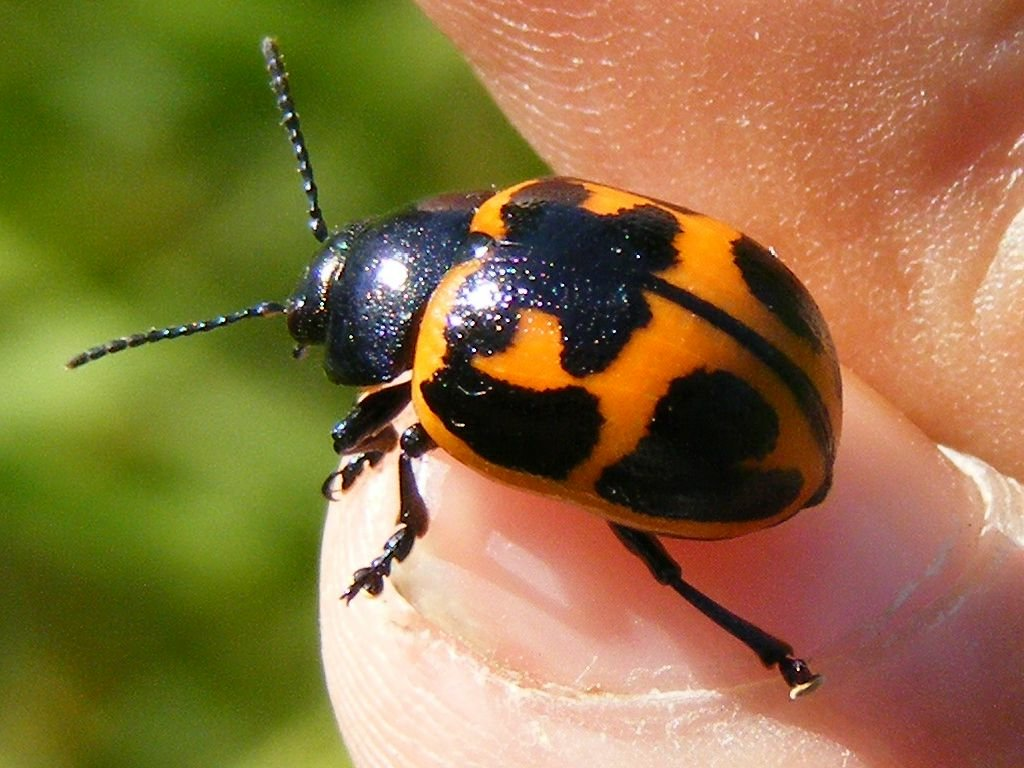

Scientific classification
- Kingdom: Animalia
- Phylum: Arthropoda
- Clade: Pancrustacea
- Class: Insecta
- Order: Coleoptera
- Suborder: Polyphaga
- Infraorder: Cucujiformia
- Family: Chrysomelidae
- Genus: Labidomera
- Species: L. clivicollis

Binomial name
- Labidomera clivicollis (Kirby, 1837)

Synonyms
- Chrysomela clivicollis Kirby 1837

= Milkweed leaf beetle =

Species of beetle

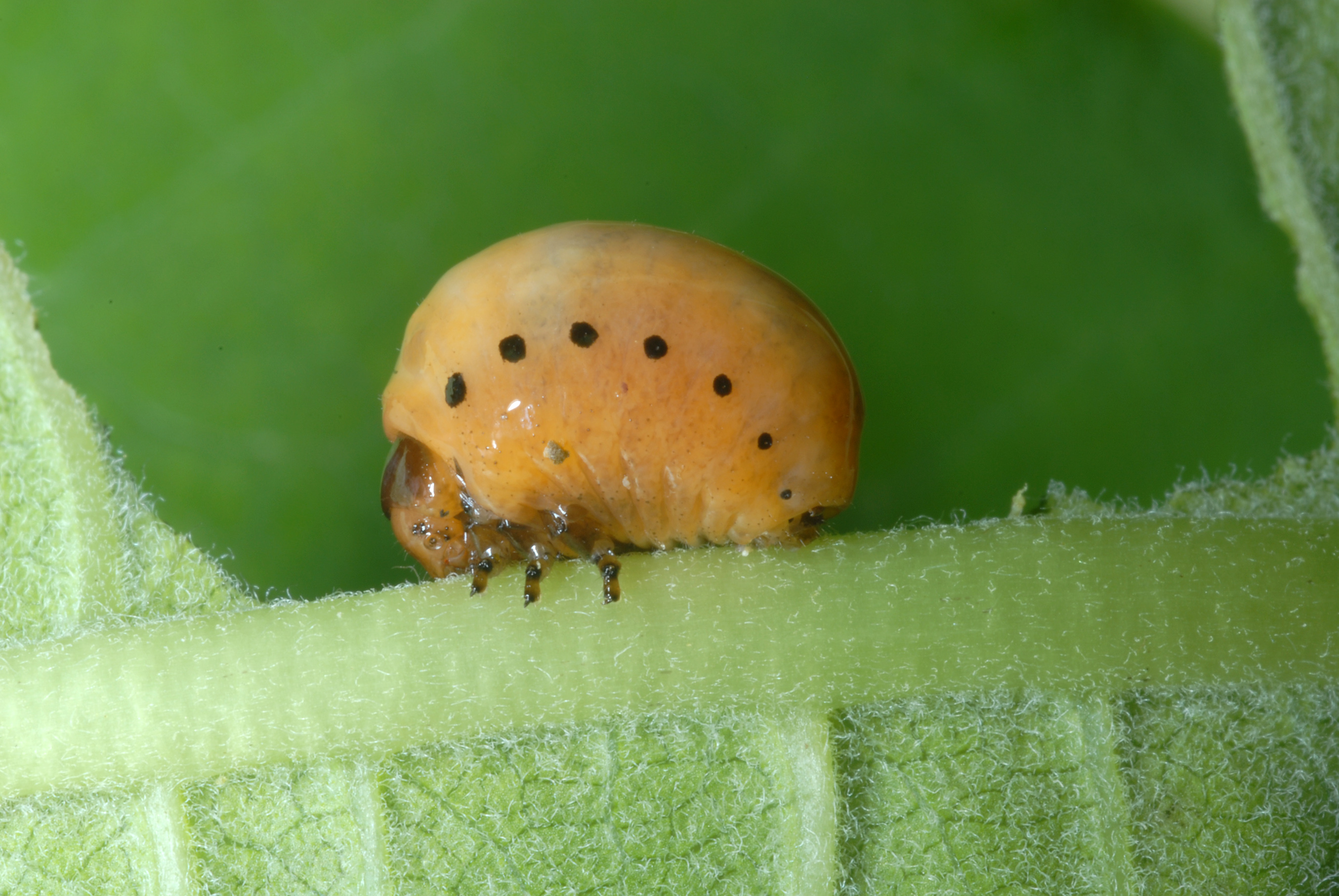
L. clivicollis larva

The milkweed leaf beetle, or swamp milkweed leaf beetle (Labidomera clivicollis) is a species of leaf beetle from the family Chrysomelidae. It is found in eastern Northern America. These leaf beetles are round bodied, 8–11 mm in length, with a black head and pronotum and bright orange to yellow elytra with variable mottled black patches. L. clivicollis somewhat resembles a large ladybird beetle, and though it is not in the ladybird family (Coccinellidae), it is closely related (infraorder Cucujiformia). The larvae are light orange, white, or gray with a black pronotum and prominent black spots on the spiracles. They are grub-like and can be found feeding on milkweeds, especially swamp milkweed. Milkweed leaf beetle larvae can be distinguished from visually similar and closely related species by color, host plant, and number of spots.

== Diet ==
There are a number of L. clivicollis host plants which are toxic to most herbivores. Many are in the dogbane family (Apocynaceae) including milkweeds, especially swamp milkweed (Asclepias incarnata) and common milkweed (Asclepias syriaca); swallow-wort (Cynanchum); twinevine (Funastrum).

== Life cycle ==
The female lays small groups of orange jellybean-like eggs on its host plant.

Miniature sized larvae, about the same shape as later instars, hatch in about a week and graze night and day.

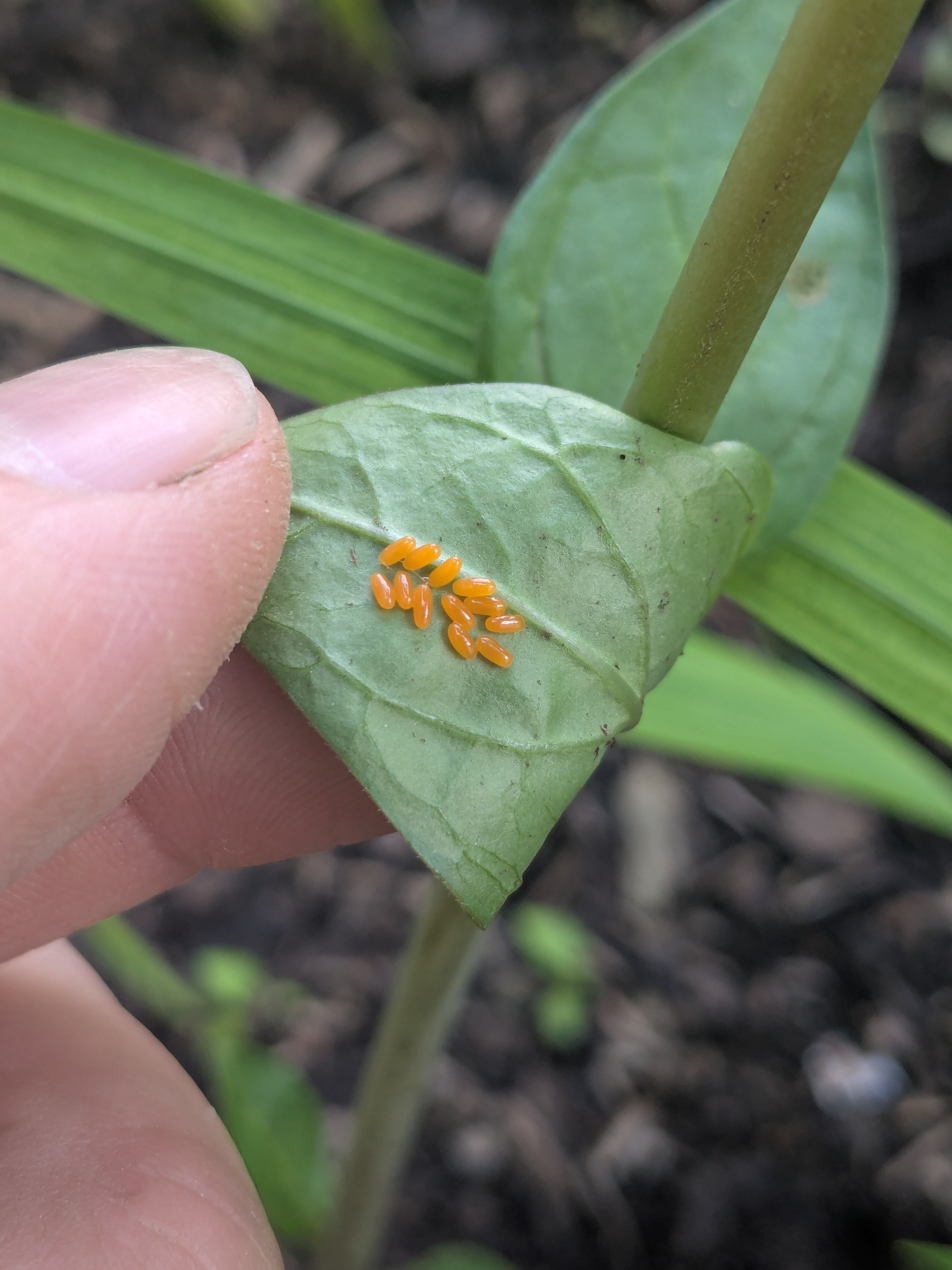
Eggs of L. clivicollis laid on the underside of an Asclepias incarnata leaf in early June in NY, USA.

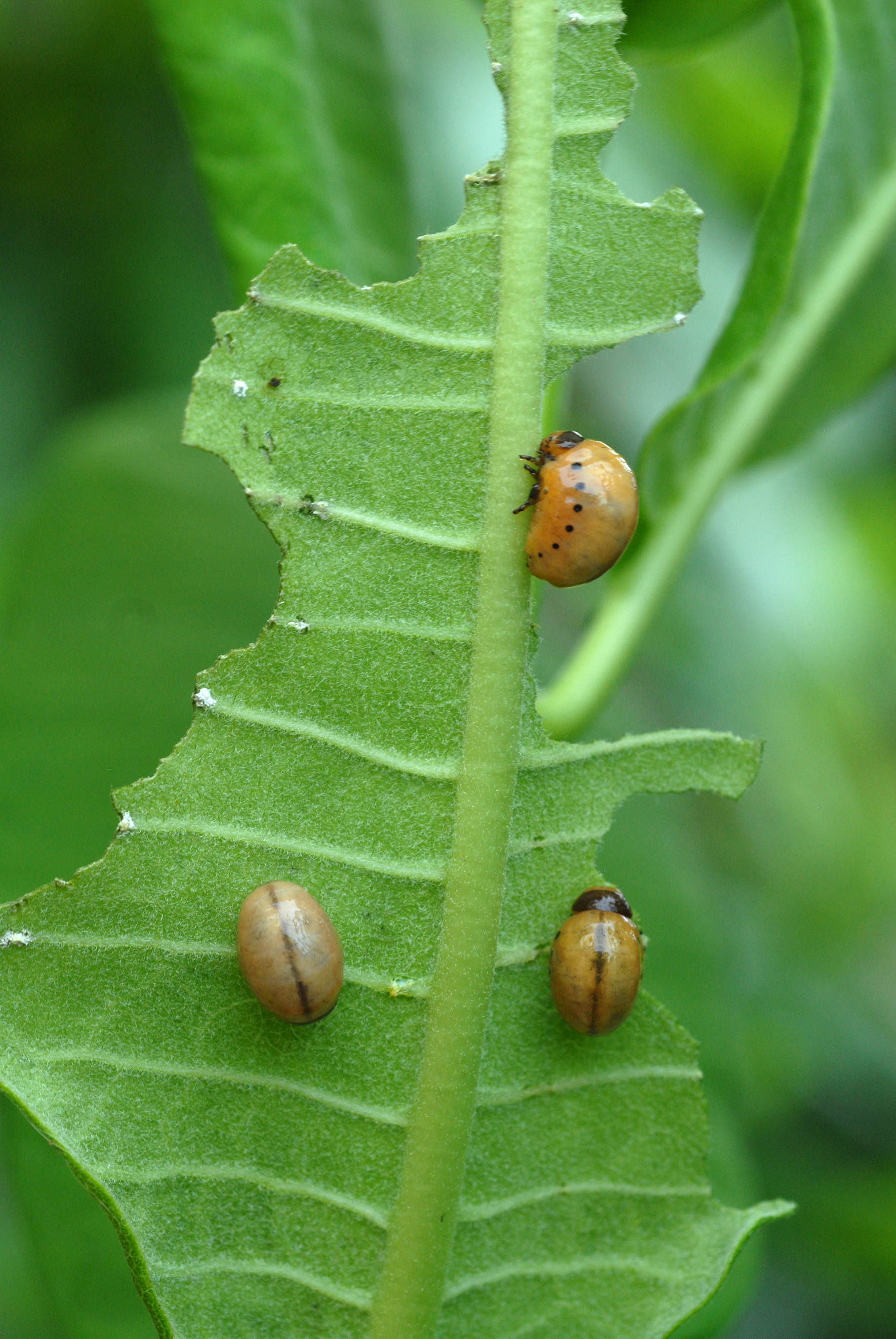
L. clivicollis larvae eating milkweed leaf

Finally the mature larvae move to the soil to pupate. After a few weeks, adults emerge to start the next generation eating the same host plants as the larvae. An adult may displace a monarch larvae to feed at the same site.

Milkweed leaf beetle adult on milkweed

As autumn approaches, the adults feed and eventually find places to shelter through the winter.

== Acquired protection ==
The bright coloration of the milkweed leaf beetle is a classic example of Aposematism. Several insects that share some of the same hosts sport similar warning coloration: monarch, milkweed tussock moths, milkweed beetles and milkweed bugs and hence illustrate Műllerian mimicry.

These insects have evolved the ability to thrive on these plants despite the presence of noxious poisons the plants have evolved to protect themselves from most herbivores. These toxins help protect these insects from being eaten by visually gifted predators like birds that regularly prey on caterpillars, butterflies, and beetles. The conspicuous orange and black colors serve as a reminder of a potentially nasty gastronomic misadventure to experienced birds and other predators that may have attempted to make a meal of them.
