= Labidomera suturella =

Tropical milkweed leaf beetle

Scientific classification
- Domain: Eukaryota
- Kingdom: Animalia
- Phylum: Arthropoda
- Class: Insecta
- Order: Coleoptera
- Suborder: Polyphaga
- Infraorder: Cucujiformia
- Family: Chrysomelidae
- Genus: Labidomera
- Species: L. suturella

Binomial name
- Labidomera suturella Chevrolat

Species of beetle

Labidomera suturella, commonly known as the tropical milkweed leaf beetle is a species of beetle from the family Chrysomelidae.

== Description ==
L. suturella is a small, rounded beetle with a black head, pronotum, and elytra - the elytra are spotted with orange or yellow patches.

== Distribution ==
L. suturella has a native range in Central and Southern America, from Northern Mexico to Brazil.

== Lifecycle ==
Adults are active between April and August.

A study has shown that this species exhibits maternal care of larvae; they were observed guarding larvae whilst feeding on Witheringia heteroclita in Costa Rica This was a response to predatory threats, as worker ants of Paraponera clavata were observed carrying larvae to their nest.

== Diet ==
As the common name suggests, L. suturella is primarily associated with milkweeds (Asclepias).
