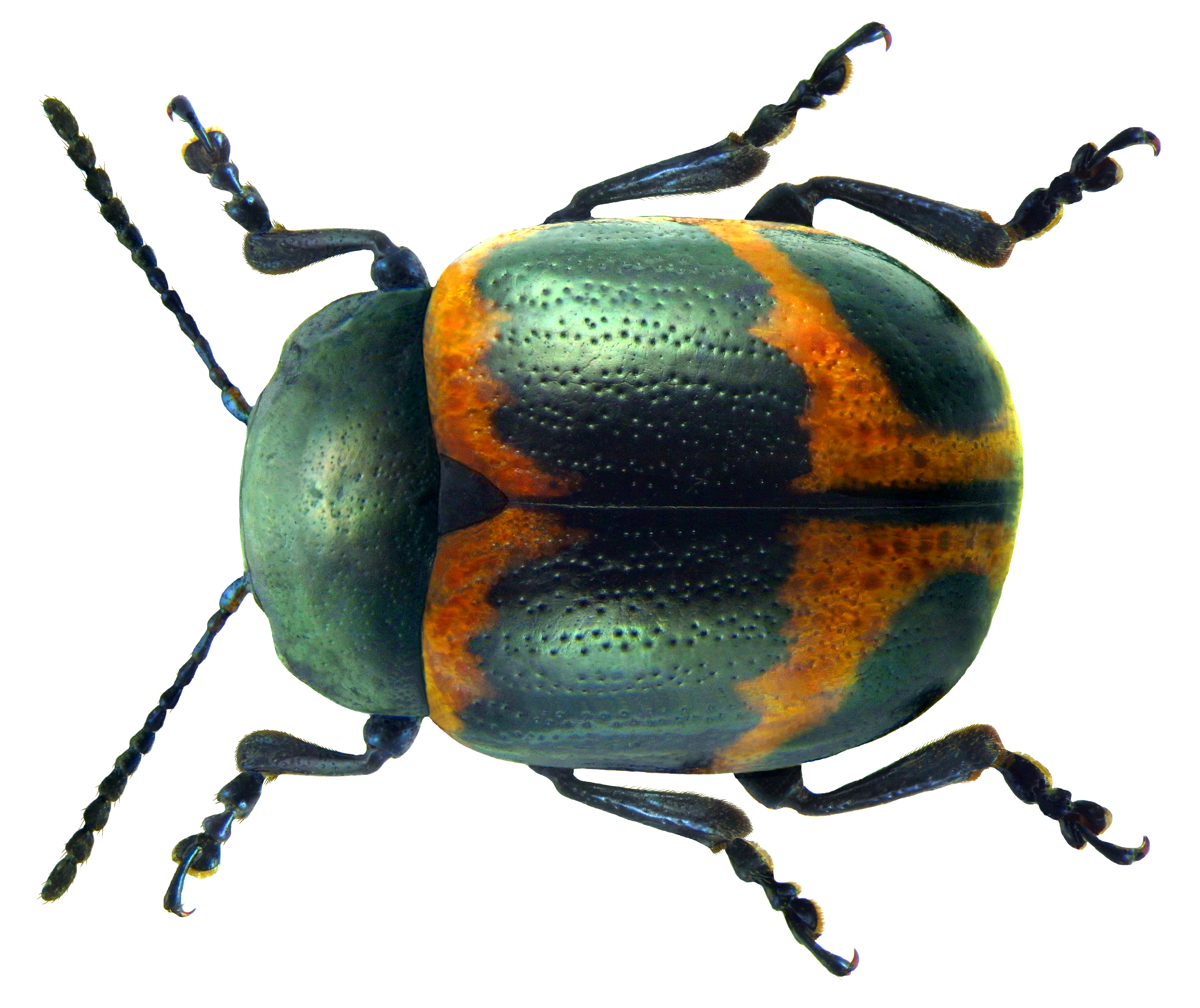
- Labidomera clivicollis

Scientific classification
- Kingdom: Animalia
- Phylum: Arthropoda
- Clade: Pancrustacea
- Class: Insecta
- Order: Coleoptera
- Suborder: Polyphaga
- Infraorder: Cucujiformia
- Family: Chrysomelidae
- Tribe: Chrysomelini
- Genus: Labidomera; Chevrolat in Dejean, 1836

Species
- See text

= Labidomera =

Genus of beetles

Labidomera is a genus of leaf beetles, family Chrysomelidae.

== Taxonomy ==
The genus Labidomera is assigned to the chrysomelid beetle tribe Chrysomelini (in subfamily Chrysomelinae).

== Description ==
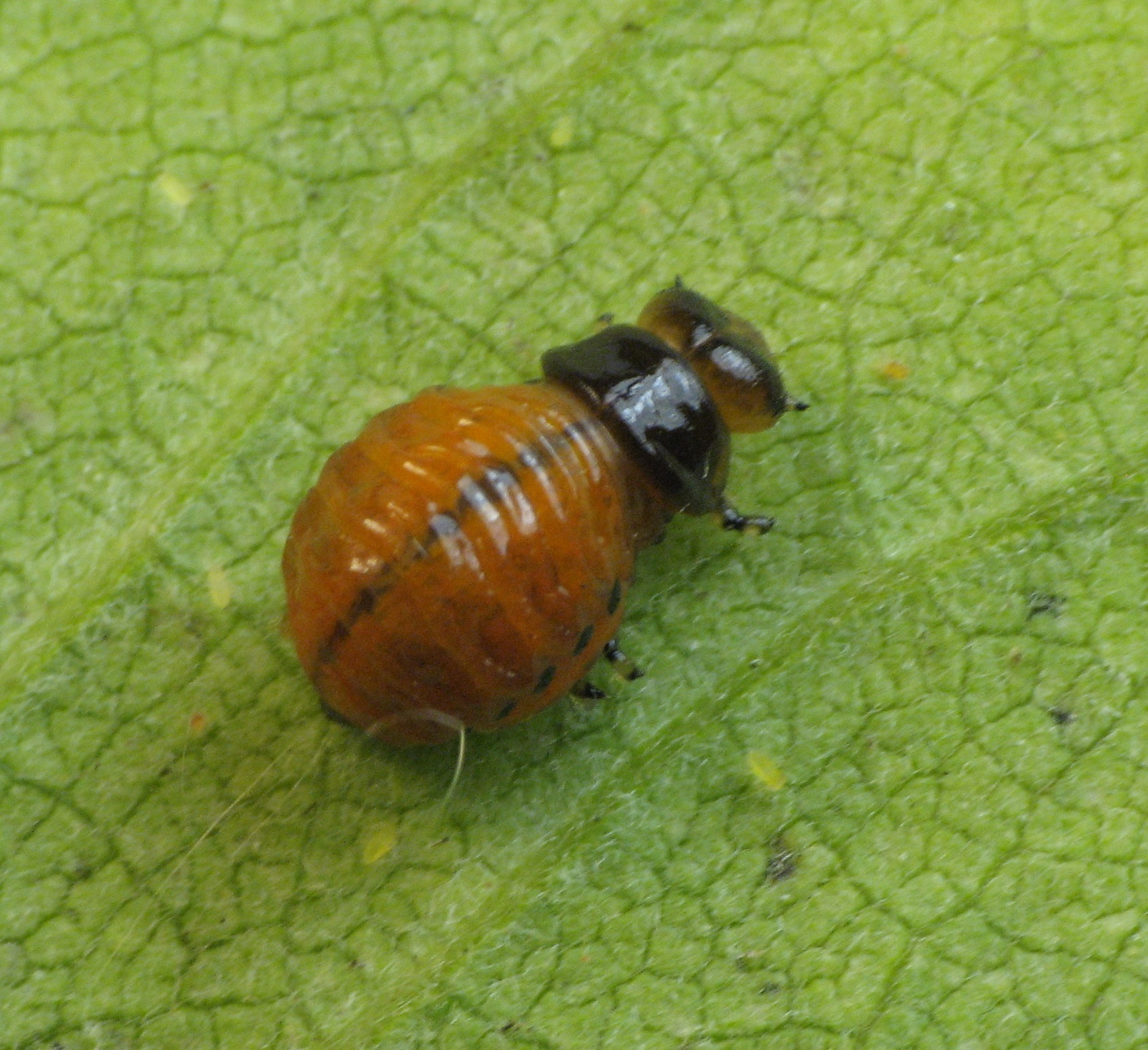
Labidomera clivicollis, larva

Larvae have an unusual locomotion.

== Distribution ==
The native range of Labidomera clivicollis is North America, from southern Canada to the central United States. The other species are farther south.

== Species ==
There are four recognized species, including the following:

- Labidomera clivicollis (Kirby, 1837)
- Labidomera suturella Guérin-Méneville, 1838
