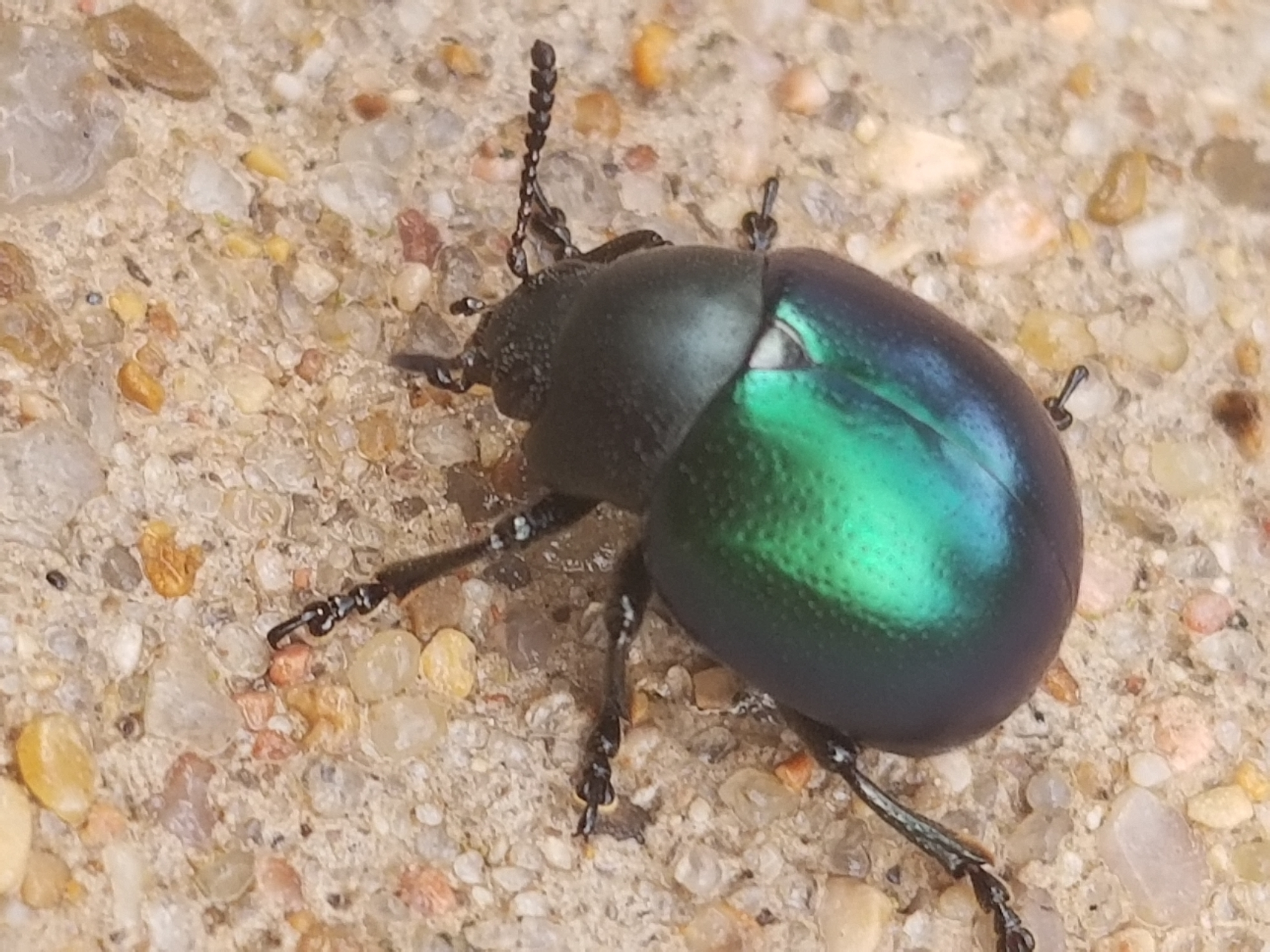

Scientific classification
- Domain: Eukaryota
- Kingdom: Animalia
- Phylum: Arthropoda
- Class: Insecta
- Order: Coleoptera
- Suborder: Polyphaga
- Infraorder: Cucujiformia
- Family: Chrysomelidae
- Genus: Leptinotarsa
- Species: L. haldemani

Binomial name
- Leptinotarsa haldemani Rogers, 1856

= Leptinotarsa haldemani =

Species of beetle

Leptinotarsa haldemani, commonly known as Haldeman's green potato beetle, is a glossy green-colored species of beetle in the leaf beetle family Chrysomelidae. It was named in honour of Samuel Stehman Haldeman, a 19th-century American entomologist who collected insect specimens in Texas.

== Description ==
This small beetle has a black head, antennae, thorax, and legs. Its general body shape is domed and the elytra are usually deep metallic green, but sometimes metallic purple or blue.

== Distribution ==
This species is found in Mexico, Central America, and the US states of Arizona, New Mexico, Oklahoma, and Texas.

== Host plants ==
This beetle is found on members of the family Solanaceae including wild species of Physalis, Solanum douglasii, and the Anderson thornbush, Lycium andersonii. It is also occasionally found on potatoes.
