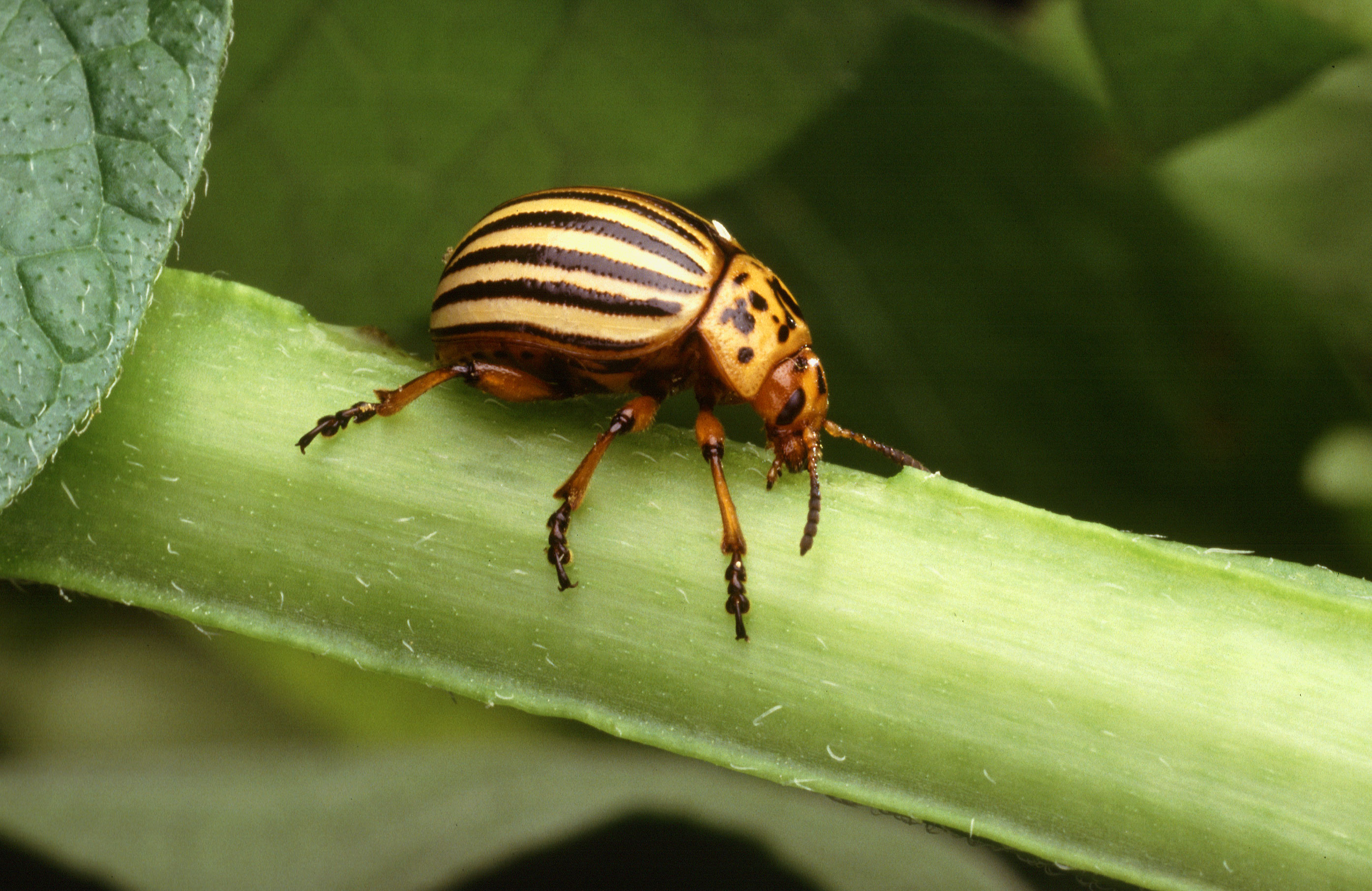
- Colorado potato beetle (Leptinotarsa decemlineata)
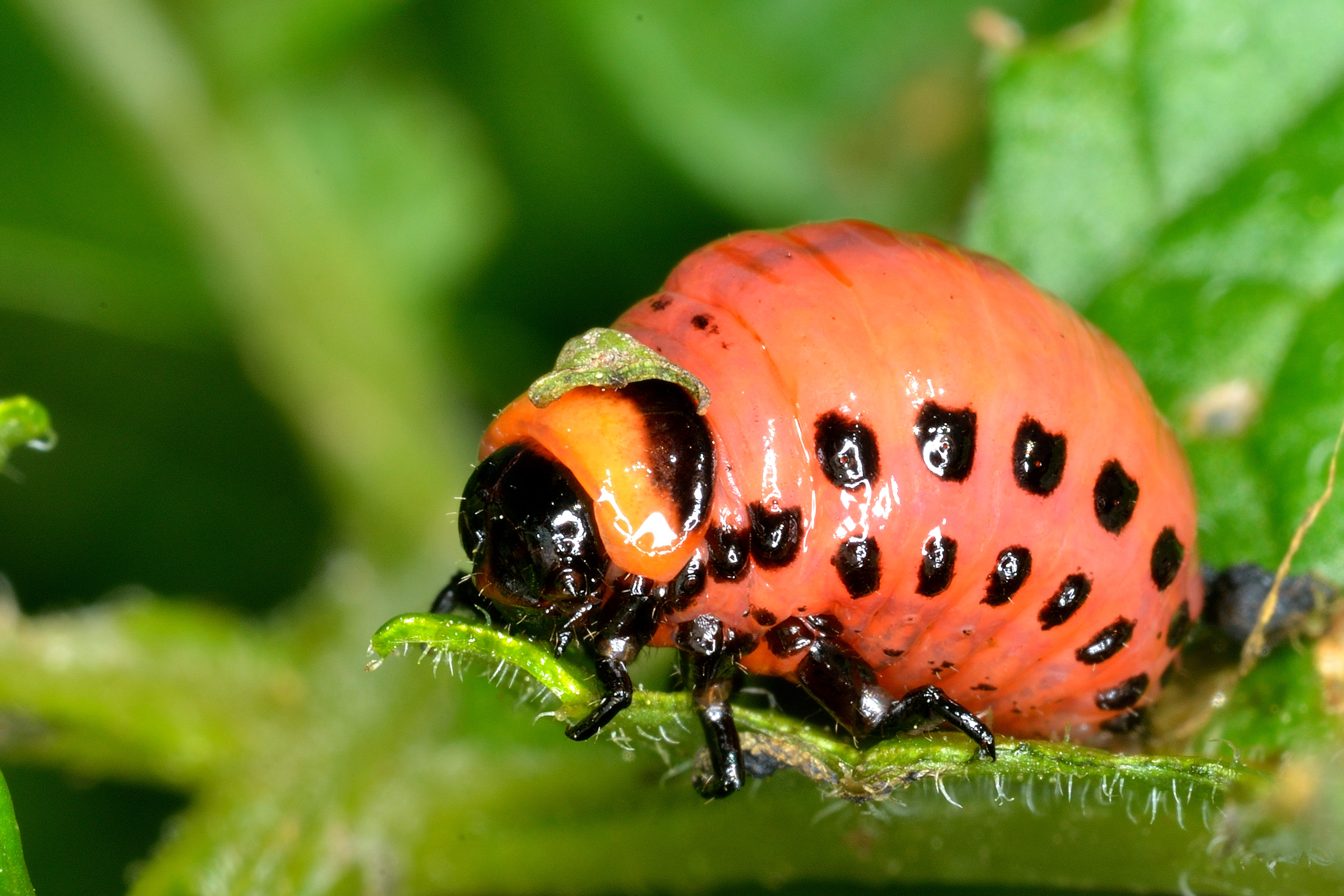
- Leptinotarsa decemlineata larva

Scientific classification
- Kingdom: Animalia
- Phylum: Arthropoda
- Clade: Pancrustacea
- Class: Insecta
- Order: Coleoptera
- Suborder: Polyphaga
- Infraorder: Cucujiformia
- Family: Chrysomelidae
- Tribe: Chrysomelini
- Genus: Leptinotarsa; Chevrolat in Dejean, 1836

Type species
- Leptinotarsa heydeni Stål, 1858

Species
- See text

= Leptinotarsa =

Genus of beetles

Leptinotarsa is a genus of leaf beetles. The most well-known species is the Colorado potato beetle (Leptinotarsa decemlineata), an economically significant invasive crop pest. The closely related genus Stilodes has often been merged with Leptinotarsa, with some dispute about which name applies, but the type species – L.heydeni and "L." humeralis when both placed in Leptinotarsa – do not seem to be particularly close to each other.

Several species in the genus produce leptinotarsin, a toxin similar to the diamphotoxin produced by species of the African leaf beetle genus Diamphidia. Some Leptinotarsa species are parasitised by ground beetles of genus Lebia.

== Selected species ==
- Leptinotarsa behrensi Harold, 1877
- Leptinotarsa belti
- Leptinotarsa cacica
- Leptinotarsa chalcospila
- Leptinotarsa collinsi Wilcox, 1972
- Leptinotarsa decemlineata (Say, 1824) – Colorado potato beetle
- Leptinotarsa defecta Stål, 1859
- Leptinotarsa dellacasai Daccordi & Zoia, 2017
- Leptinotarsa flavitarsus
- Leptinotarsa gilberti Daccordi & Zoia, 2017
- Leptinotarsa haldemani Rogers, 1856 – Haldeman's green potato beetle
- Leptinotarsa heydeni Stål, 1858
- Leptinotarsa juncta (Germar, 1824) – false potato beetle
- Leptinotarsa lineolata Stål, 1863
- Leptinotarsa mariachia Daccordi & Zoia, 2017
- Leptinotarsa peninsularis Horn, 1894
- Leptinotarsa rubiginosa Rogers, 1856 – reddish potato beetle
- Leptinotarsa texana Schaeffer, 1906 – Texas potato beetle
- Leptinotarsa tlascalana Stål, 1858
- Leptinotarsa tumamoca Tower, 1918
- Leptinotarsa typographica
- Leptinotarsa undecimlineata
