= Leptinotarsa peninsularis =

Scientific classification
- Kingdom: Animalia
- Phylum: Arthropoda
- Class: Insecta
- Order: Coleoptera
- Suborder: Polyphaga
- Infraorder: Cucujiformia
- Family: Chrysomelidae
- Genus: Leptinotarsa
- Species: L. peninsularis

Binomial name
- Leptinotarsa peninsularis Horn, 1894

Species of beetle

Leptinotarsa peninsularis is a species of leaf beetle in the family Chrysomelidae. It is found in Central and North America.

== Appearance ==
This species appears as a normal leaf beetle shape with 10 segmented antennae with the last five darker brown and the first five light brown. the head is half turtle-shell like and brownish red. the back of the body is round with white stripes forming 2 black dove wing patterned side-wings and an upside down black pine tree shape pattern through the middle.
