= Leptinotarsa collinsi =

Scientific classification
- Domain: Eukaryota
- Kingdom: Animalia
- Phylum: Arthropoda
- Class: Insecta
- Order: Coleoptera
- Suborder: Polyphaga
- Infraorder: Cucujiformia
- Family: Chrysomelidae
- Genus: Leptinotarsa
- Species: L. collinsi

Binomial name
- Leptinotarsa collinsi Wilcox, 1972

Species of beetle

Leptinotarsa collinsi is a species of leaf beetle in the family Chrysomelidae. It is found in North America.
