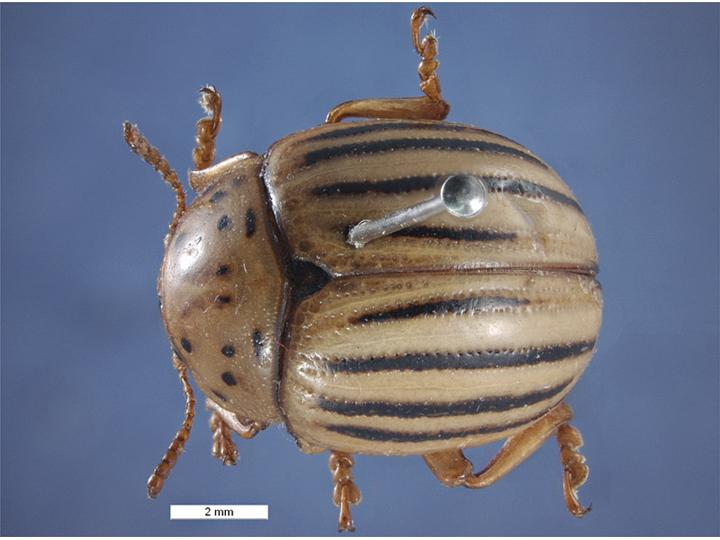

Scientific classification
- Domain: Eukaryota
- Kingdom: Animalia
- Phylum: Arthropoda
- Class: Insecta
- Order: Coleoptera
- Suborder: Polyphaga
- Infraorder: Cucujiformia
- Family: Chrysomelidae
- Genus: Leptinotarsa
- Species: L. texana

Binomial name
- Leptinotarsa texana Schaeffer, 1906

= Leptinotarsa texana =

Species of beetle

Leptinotarsa texana, the Texas potato beetle, is a species of leaf beetle in the family Chrysomelidae. It is found in Africa, Central America, and North America.

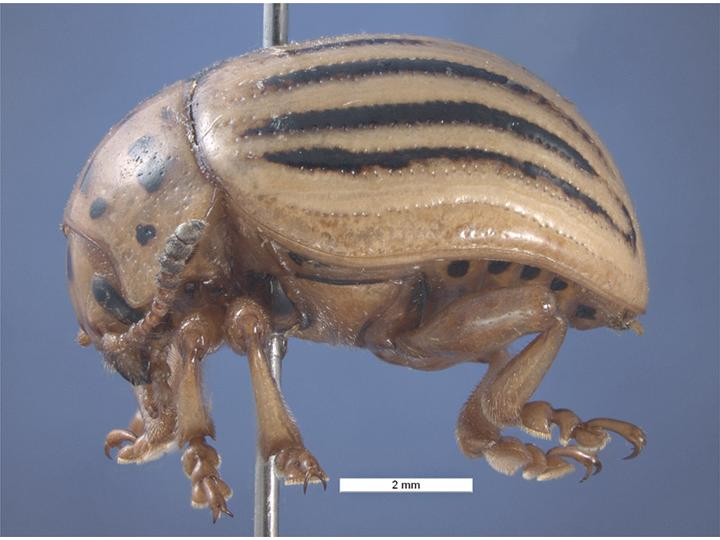
Texas potato beetle, Leptinotarsa texana
