= Leptinotarsa tumamoca =

Scientific classification
- Domain: Eukaryota
- Kingdom: Animalia
- Phylum: Arthropoda
- Class: Insecta
- Order: Coleoptera
- Suborder: Polyphaga
- Infraorder: Cucujiformia
- Family: Chrysomelidae
- Genus: Leptinotarsa
- Species: L. tumamoca

Binomial name
- Leptinotarsa tumamoca Tower, 1918

Species of beetle

Leptinotarsa tumamoca is a species of leaf beetle in the family Chrysomelidae. It is found in North America.
