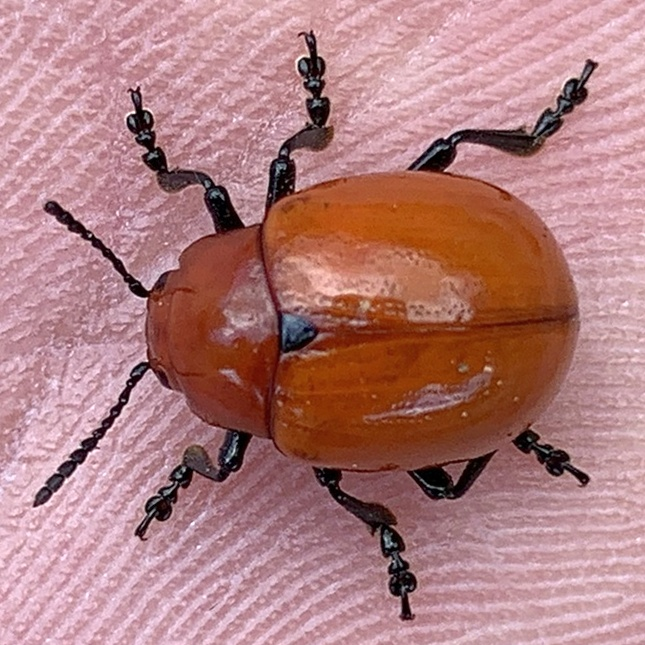

Scientific classification
- Kingdom: Animalia
- Phylum: Arthropoda
- Class: Insecta
- Order: Coleoptera
- Suborder: Polyphaga
- Infraorder: Cucujiformia
- Family: Chrysomelidae
- Genus: Leptinotarsa
- Species: L. rubiginosa

Binomial name
- Leptinotarsa rubiginosa (Rogers, 1856)

= Leptinotarsa rubiginosa =

Species of beetle

Leptinotarsa rubiginosa, the reddish potato beetle, is a species of leaf beetle in the family Chrysomelidae. It is found in Central America and North America.
