= Leptinotarsa lineolata =

Scientific classification
- Domain: Eukaryota
- Kingdom: Animalia
- Phylum: Arthropoda
- Class: Insecta
- Order: Coleoptera
- Suborder: Polyphaga
- Infraorder: Cucujiformia
- Family: Chrysomelidae
- Genus: Leptinotarsa
- Species: L. lineolata

Binomial name
- Leptinotarsa lineolata (Stål, 1863)

Species of beetle

Leptinotarsa lineolata is a species of leaf beetle in the family Chrysomelidae. It is found in Central America and North America.
