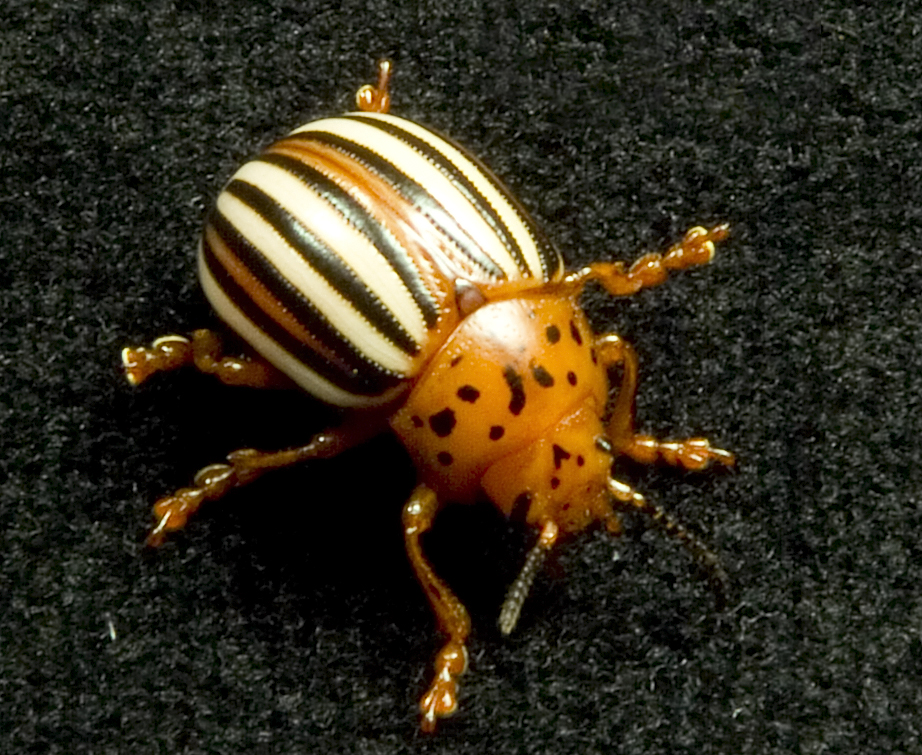

Scientific classification
- Domain: Eukaryota
- Kingdom: Animalia
- Phylum: Arthropoda
- Class: Insecta
- Order: Coleoptera
- Suborder: Polyphaga
- Infraorder: Cucujiformia
- Family: Chrysomelidae
- Genus: Leptinotarsa
- Species: L. juncta

Binomial name
- Leptinotarsa juncta (Germar, 1824)

= False potato beetle =

Species of beetle

The false potato beetle (Leptinotarsa juncta) is a beetle found primarily in the Mid-Atlantic and Southeastern United States. Its distribution extends to Maine.

Adult beetles emerge from the soil in the late spring or early summer and begin breeding, and a population may go through one to three generations in a summer.

The false potato beetle feeds on solanaceous weeds such as horsenettle, Solanum carolinense. It also feeds on other solanaceous plants, such as species of ground cherry or husk tomato, Physalis spp., and bittersweet, Solanum dulcamara, but no growth and reproduction occurs when feeding on the potato, Solanum tuberosum.

L. juncta can be easily confused with its congener the Colorado potato beetle, Leptinotarsa decemlineata. While the adult false potato beetle has alternating black and white strips on its back, like the Colorado potato beetle, one of the white strips in the center of each wing cover is missing and replaced by a light brown strip. The eggs are slightly larger and fewer are found in a cluster. The hump-backed larva is similar, but with only one row of dark spots on each side. The two species are apparently incapable of crossbreeding. Of the two, only the Colorado potato beetle is a serious pest.
