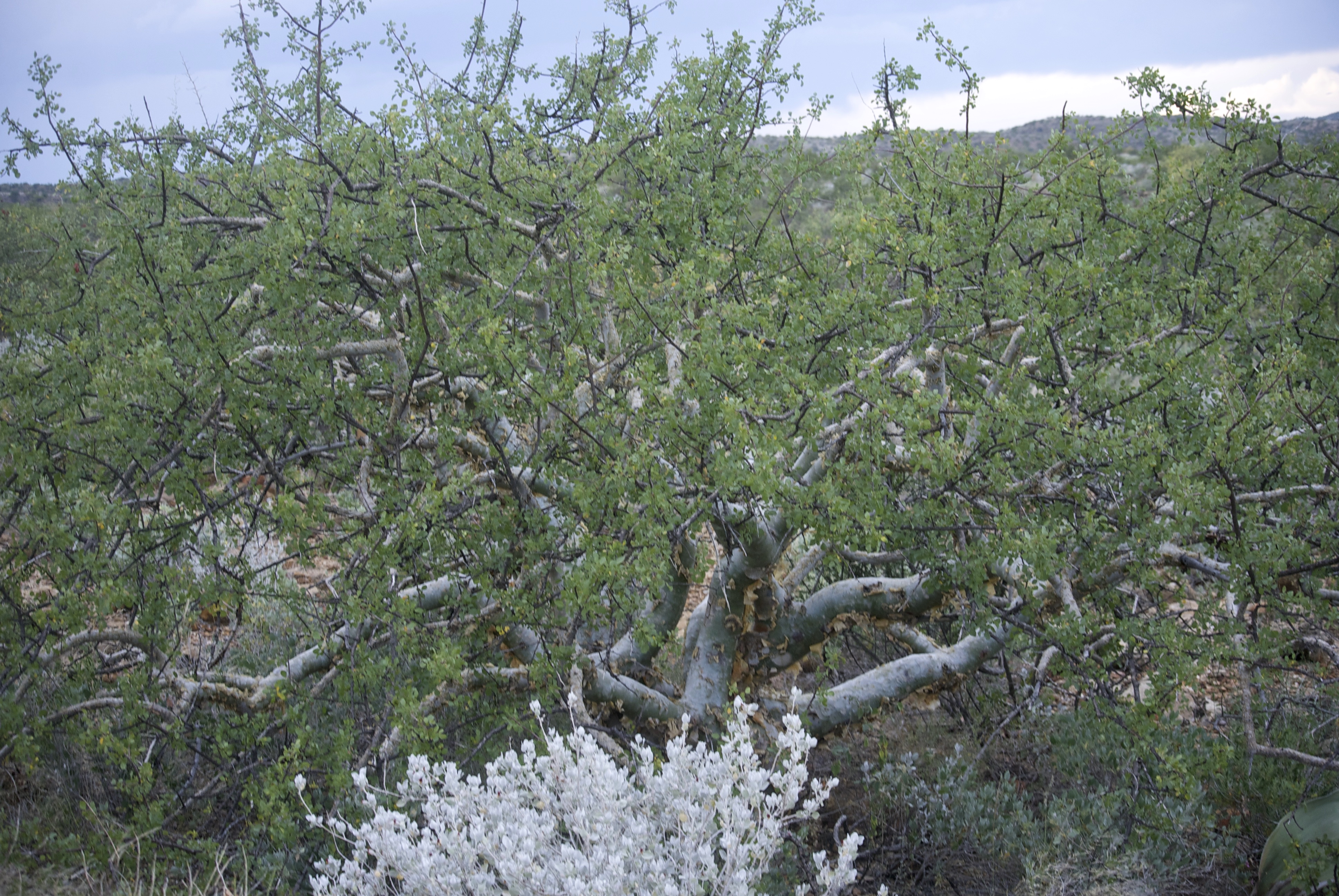

Conservation status
- Least Concern (IUCN 3.1)

Scientific classification
- Kingdom: Plantae
- Clade: Tracheophytes
- Clade: Angiosperms
- Clade: Eudicots
- Clade: Rosids
- Order: Sapindales
- Family: Burseraceae
- Genus: Commiphora
- Species: C. angolensis

Binomial name
- Commiphora angolensis Engl., Monogr Phan 4: 24 (1883)

Synonyms
- Balsamea angolensis Hiern; Balsamea longebracteata (Engl.) Hiern; Commiphora gossweileri Engl.; Commiphora kwebensis N. E. Br.; Commiphora longebracteata Engl.; Commiphora nigrescens Engl.; Commiphora olivieri Engl.; Commiphora rehmanniana Engl.; Commiphora rehmannii Engl.

= Commiphora angolensis =

Species of flowering plant

Commiphora angolensis, also known as sand commiphora or sand corkwood, is a shrub species in the genus Commiphora growing mainly in Angola and Namibia.

The adults and larvae of Diamphidia nigroornata feed on C. angolensis.

The bark of C. angolensis contains condensed tannins and the anthocyanin petunidin-3-rhamnoglucoside.

== See also ==
- List of Southern African indigenous trees and woody lianes
