= Diamphotoxin =

Identifiers
CAS Number	87915-42-2
ChemSpider	none
MeSH	diamphotoxin

Properties
Molar mass	~ 60,000 g/mol
- Except where otherwise noted, data are given for materials in their standard state (at 25 °C [77 °F], 100 kPa). Infobox references

Diamphotoxin is a toxin produced by larvae and pupae of the beetle genus Diamphidia. Diamphotoxin is a hemolytic, cardiotoxic, and highly labile single-chain polypeptide bound to a protein that protects it from deactivation.

Diamphotoxin increases the permeability of cell membranes of red blood cells. Although this does not affect the normal flow of ions between cells, it allows all small ions to pass through cell membranes easily, which fatally disrupts the cells' ion levels. Although diamphotoxin has no neurotoxic effect, its hemolytic effect is lethal, and may reduce hemoglobin levels by as much as 75%.

The San people of Southern Africa use diamphotoxin as an arrow poison for hunting game. The toxin paralyses muscles gradually. Large mammals hunted in this way die slowly from a small injection of the poison.

Several leaf beetles species of genus Leptinotarsa produce a similar toxin, leptinotarsin.

== See also ==
- Palytoxin
- Arrow poison
