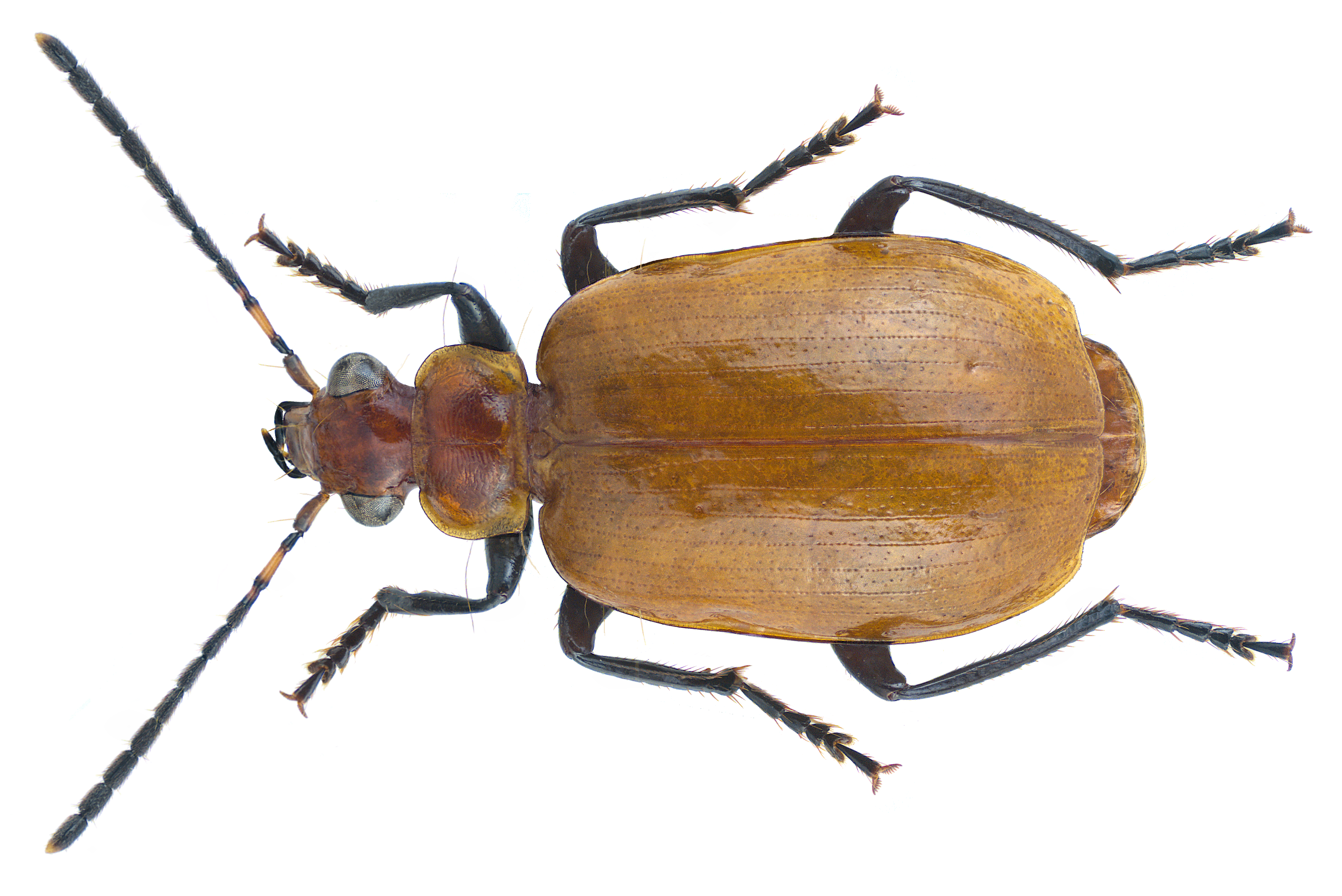
- From Kenya

Scientific classification
- Kingdom: Animalia
- Phylum: Arthropoda
- Class: Insecta
- Order: Coleoptera
- Suborder: Adephaga
- Family: Carabidae
- Subfamily: Lebiinae
- Tribe: Lebiini
- Subtribe: Lebiina
- Genus: Lebistina; Motschulsky, 1864

= Lebistina =

Genus of beetles

Lebistina is a genus in the beetle family Carabidae. There are about 14 described species in the genus Lebistina.

== Species ==
These 14 species belong to the genus Lebistina:

- Lebistina bicolor Chaudoir, 1878 (Tanzania)
- Lebistina caffra Chaudoir, 1877 (South Africa)
- Lebistina flavomaculata (Dejean, 1831) (Senegal/Gambia and Tanzania)
- Lebistina holubi Péringuey, 1896 (Democratic Republic of the Congo and South Africa)
- Lebistina neuvillei Alluaud, 1918 (Kenya)
- Lebistina peringueyi Liebke, 1928 (Africa)
- Lebistina petersae Assmann; Drees & Zumstein, 2017 (Kenya and Tanzania)
- Lebistina picta (Dejean, 1825) (Africa)
- Lebistina rehagei Assmann; Starke & Terlutter, 2017 (Kenya)
- Lebistina rufomarginata Basilewsky, 1948 (Tanzania)
- Lebistina sanguinea (Boheman, 1848) (Mozambique, Zimbabwe, and South Africa)
- Lebistina spectabilis Péringuey, 1904 (Tanzania, Malawi, and South Africa)
- Lebistina subcruciata Fairmaire, 1894 (Africa)
- Lebistina unicolor (Putzeys, 1880) (Africa)
