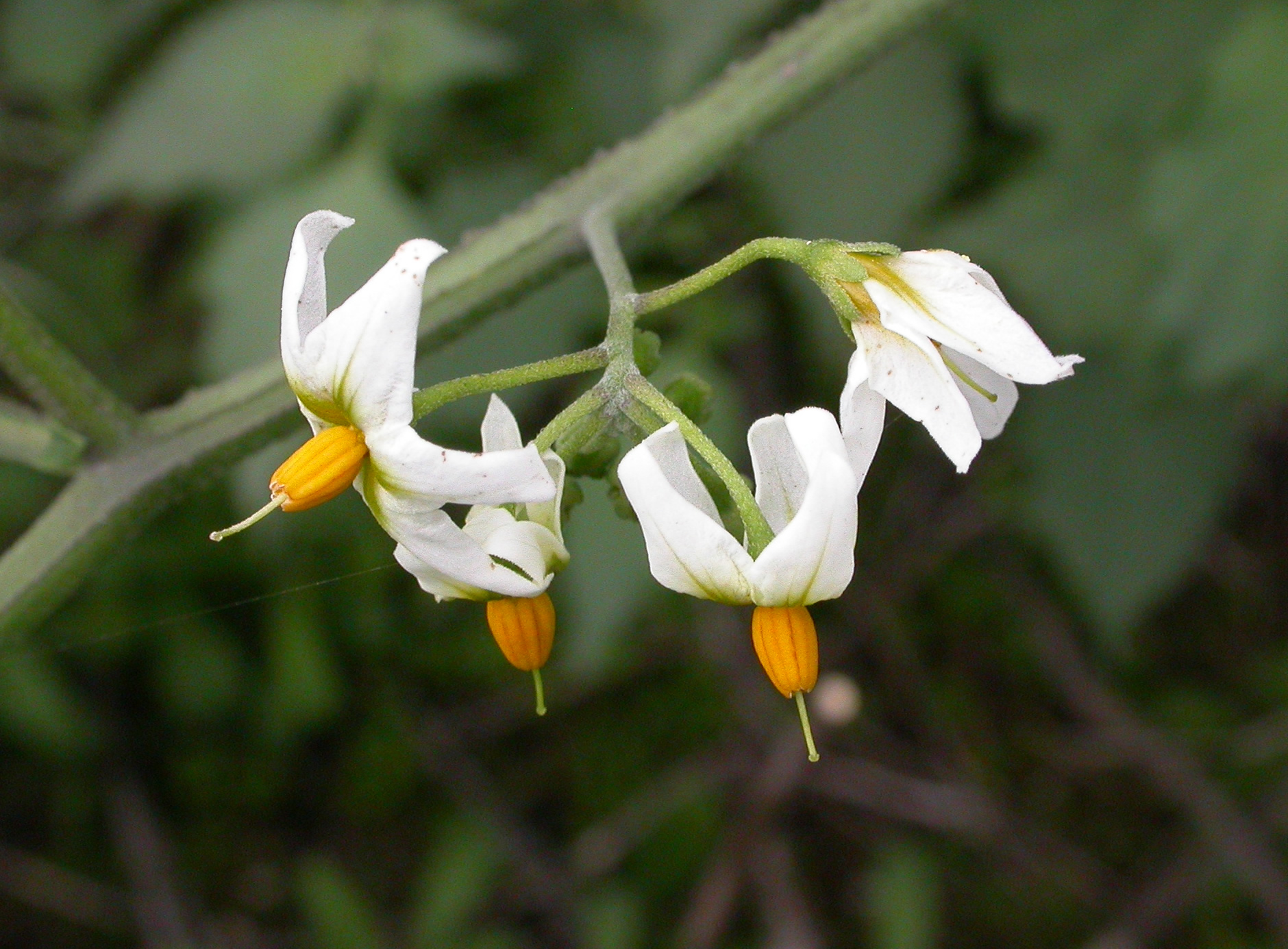

Scientific classification
- Kingdom: Plantae
- Clade: Tracheophytes
- Clade: Angiosperms
- Clade: Eudicots
- Clade: Asterids
- Order: Solanales
- Family: Solanaceae
- Genus: Solanum
- Species: S. douglasii

Binomial name
- Solanum douglasii Dunal

= Solanum douglasii =

Species of flowering plant in the nightshade family

Solanum douglasii is a North American species of plant in the family Solanaceae known by the common name greenspot nightshade.

== Description ==
Solanum douglasii is a perennial herb or subshrub approaching 2 metres (6 1/2 ft) in maximum height. The stem is coated in short, white hairs. The leaves may be up to 9 centimetres (3 1/2 in) long and have smooth or toothed edges.

The inflorescence is an umbel-shaped array of flowers with star-shaped white corollas up to a centimeter wide. There are generally green spots at the bases of the corolla lobes. The yellow anthers are a few millimeters in length. Flowers may be seen blooming throughout much of the year.

The fruit is a spherical black berry up to 1 cm (1/2 in) wide.

== Distribution and habitat ==
It is native to the northern half of Mexico and the southwestern south-central United States. Its habitat includes scrub and woodland.

== Uses ==
Many species in the genus are toxic. Native Americans used the juice of the berries medicinally, and the Luiseño used it as dye for tattooing.
