= Hendrik Jacob Wikar =

Finnish explorer

Henrik Jakob Wikar or Hendrik Jakob Wikar (born 28 October 1752 Kokkola, Finland (at that time Sweden)) was a Finnish explorer who travelled in Southern Africa and wrote his journal describing the life of the Khoisan people.

Wikar's father was Jakob Johan Wikar, a land surveyor and a deputy of the Riksdag of the Estates, and his mother was Margareta Carlborg, his father's second wife.

Wikar came from Ostrobothnia and studied in The Royal Academy of Turku in 1769. In 1773 he was employed in Holland by Dutch East India Company. He worked as a clerk in Cape Town in the company's hospital. He had to leave in 1775 as he could not pay his gambling debts and was publicly insulted on the streets of Cape Town and left to explore the north of the Colony where he stayed for four years. From 1778 to July 1779 he wrote his journal there. He was convicted in 1779 as a runagate but his journal saved him: he was pardoned autumn 1779, probably because the journal included some important notes for the Company. He described the rituals and customs of the Khoisan people, and numerous scientists have used his records.

== The Journal ==
- Wikar, Hendrik Jacob. 1779. Berigt aan den weleedelen gestrengen Heer Mr Joachim van Plattenbergh van't geene my ondergeteekende ontmoetis wat ik gehoord ende gezien hebbe zeedert dat ik langs de Groote rivier op ende needer gesworven hebbe. Den Haag: Plettenberg-Sammlung, Hollandsche Reichsarchiv. Published for the first time in 1916 in Reizen in Zuid-Afrika in de hollandse tijd, v. 2, ed. E.C. Godée-Molsbergen (publ. by Martinus Nijhoff); new ed. 1935, Van Riebeek Society, Cape Town. Peripherals: L.F. Maingard, "Hendrik Jacob Wikar: his editors, translators and commentators", Bantu studies, v. 10 (1936) p. 31-40.
- English translation: The journal of Hendrik Jacob Wikar (1779) : with an English translation by A. W. van der Horst and the journals of Jacobus Coetsé Jansz: (1760) and Willem van Reenen (1791) with an English translation by Dr. E. E. Mossop. / Edited, with an introduction and footnotes, by Dr. E. E. Mossop. Cape Town, : The Van Riebeeck Society, 1935.
