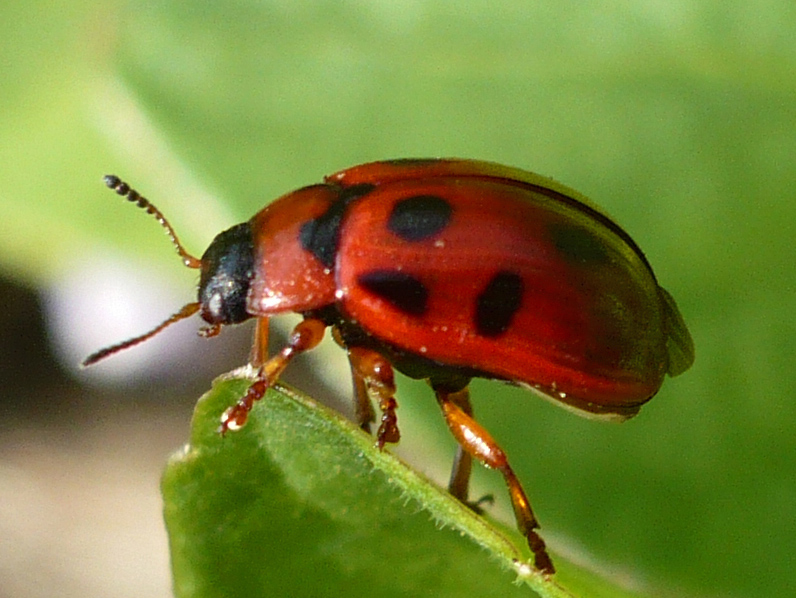
- Gonioctena decemnotata

Scientific classification
- Domain: Eukaryota
- Kingdom: Animalia
- Phylum: Arthropoda
- Class: Insecta
- Order: Coleoptera
- Suborder: Polyphaga
- Infraorder: Cucujiformia
- Family: Chrysomelidae
- Subfamily: Chrysomelinae
- Tribe: Chrysomelini
- Genus: Gonioctena; Chevrolat, 1836

Subgenera
- Brachyphytodecta; Gonioctena; Goniomena; Spartophila; Spartoxena

Synonyms
- Acanthodon Weise, 1880; Asiphytodecta Chen, 1935; Cercyonops Jacobson, 1900; Goniactis Gistel, 1856; Gonioctena Redtenbacher, 1844; Goniomena Motschoulsky, 1860; Machomena Dubois, 1887; Phytodecta Kirby, 1837; Platyphytodecta Bechyné, 1948; Sinomela Chen, 1935; Spartiophila Weise, 1884; Spartophila Stephens, 1834; Spartoxena Motschoulsky, 1860

= Gonioctena =

Genus of leaf beetles

Gonioctena is a genus of leaf beetles in the family Chrysomelidae. There are more than 90 described species in Gonioctena.

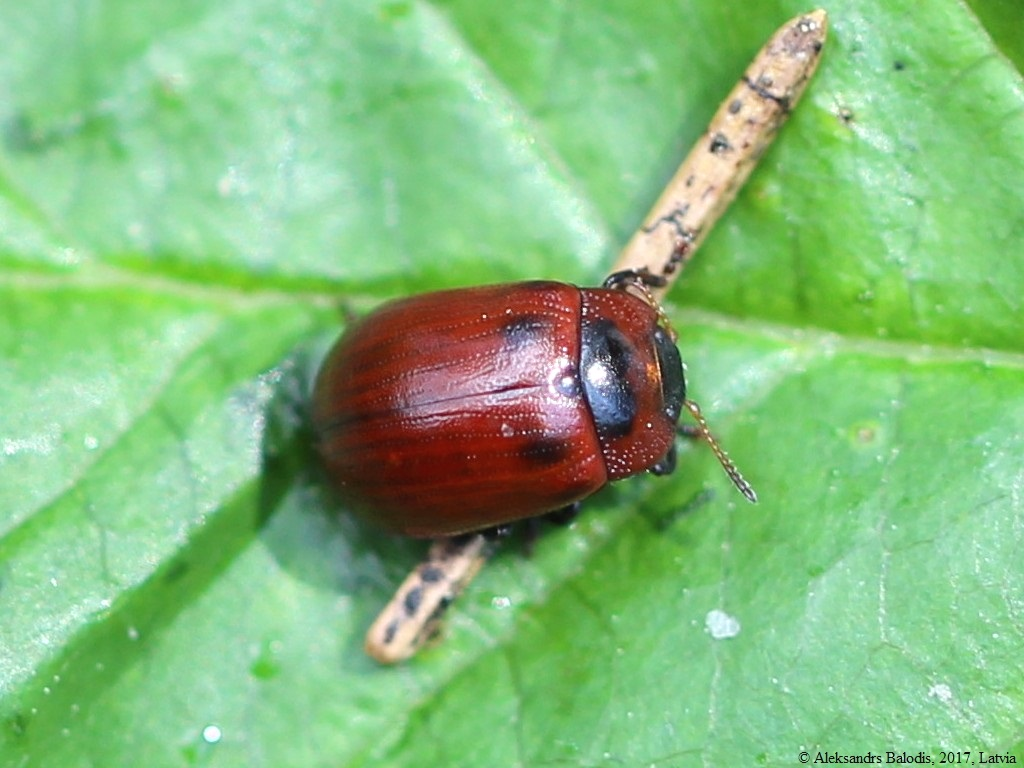
Gonioctena viminalis

== Species ==
These 93 species are listed under Gonioctena in GBIF and BioLib:

- Gonioctena aegrota (Fabricius, 1798)
- Gonioctena akbesiana Fairmaire, 1884
- Gonioctena allardi Cho, 2021
- Gonioctena altimontana Chen Sicien & Wang, 1984
- Gonioctena americana Schaeffer, 1924 (American aspen beetle)
- Gonioctena amurensis Cho & Borowiec, 2016
- Gonioctena andrzeji Daccordi & Ge, 2007
- Gonioctena arunensis Cho & Borowiec, 2016
- Gonioctena caraganae (Gebler, 1832)
- Gonioctena clymene Heer, 1847
- Gonioctena coreana (Bechyne, 1948)
- Gonioctena curtisii Oustalet, 1874
- Gonioctena davidi
- Gonioctena decaspilota (Achard, 1924)
- Gonioctena decemnotata (Marsham, 1802)
- Gonioctena eburoides (Achard, 1924)
- Gonioctena flavicornis (Suffrian, 1851)
- Gonioctena flavipennis (Jacoby, 1888)
- Gonioctena flavoplagiata (Jacoby, 1890)
- Gonioctena flexuosa Baly, 1859
- Gonioctena foochowensis Gruev, 1989
- Gonioctena fornicata (Brüggemann, 1873) (Lucerne beetle)
- Gonioctena fraudulenta Sprecher-Uebersax & Daccordi
- Gonioctena fujiana Cho & Borowiec, 2016
- Gonioctena fulva (Motschulsky, 1861)
- Gonioctena gobanzi (Reitter, 1902)
- Gonioctena gracilicornis (Kraatz, 1879)
- Gonioctena hikosana Kimoto, 1974
- Gonioctena holdhausi (Leeder, 1950)
- Gonioctena intermedia (Helliesen, 1913)
- Gonioctena interposita (Franz & Palmén, 1950)
- Gonioctena irrorata Weise, 1891
- Gonioctena issikii (Chujo, 1958)
- Gonioctena iyonis Suenaga, 2012
- Gonioctena jamadai Takizawa, 2015
- Gonioctena jani Cho & Borowiec, 2016
- Gonioctena japeti Heer, 1847
- Gonioctena japonica Chujo & Kimoto, 1960
- Gonioctena jindrai Cho & Borowiec, 2016
- Gonioctena jolantae Cho, 2022
- Gonioctena kamikawai (Chujo, 1958)
- Gonioctena kamiyai
- Gonioctena kanfani (Chen, 1941)
- Gonioctena kangdingensis
- Gonioctena kaufmanni (Miller, 1881)
- Gonioctena kidoi Takizawa & Daccordi, 1998
- Gonioctena koryeoensis
- Gonioctena kuatunensis Cho, 2017
- Gonioctena leprieuri (Pic, 1911)
- Gonioctena lineata (Gené, 1839)
- Gonioctena linnaeana (Schrank, 1781)
- Gonioctena liui Lee & Hsieh, 2022
- Gonioctena longshengensis Cho, 2017
- Gonioctena lukasi Cho, 2022
- Gonioctena mantillerii Cho, 2021
- Gonioctena mauroi Cho & Borowiec, 2016
- Gonioctena mausonensis Cho & Borowiec, 2016
- Gonioctena medvedevi Cho & Borowiec, 2016
- Gonioctena metallica Cho & Borowiec, 2014
- Gonioctena mongolica Cho & Borowiec, 2016
- Gonioctena nagaii Nakane, 1963
- Gonioctena nigroplagiata Baly, 1862
- Gonioctena nivosa (Suffrian, 1851)
- Gonioctena norvegica (Strand, 1936)
- Gonioctena notmani (Schaeffer, 1924)
- Gonioctena occidentalis (W.J.Brown, 1942)
- Gonioctena ogloblini Medvedev & Dubeshko, 1972
- Gonioctena ohmomoi Cho, Takizawa & Borowiec
- Gonioctena olivacea (Forster, 1771) (Broom Leaf Beetle)
- Gonioctena osawai Kimoto, 1996
- Gonioctena oudai Cho & Borowiec, 2016
- Gonioctena pallida (Linnaeus, 1758)
- Gonioctena primordialis Assmann, 1870
- Gonioctena procax (Normand, 1947)
- Gonioctena pseudogobanzi Kippenberg, 2001
- Gonioctena quinquepunctata (Fabricius, 1787)
- Gonioctena riyuetanensis Cho, Takizawa & Borowiec
- Gonioctena rubripennis Baly, 1862
- Gonioctena rufa (Kraatz, 1879)
- Gonioctena sapaensis Cho & Borowiec, 2016
- Gonioctena scutellaris Baly, 1862
- Gonioctena secsaouia (Kocher, 1953)
- Gonioctena sichuana Cho & Borowiec, 2014
- Gonioctena springlovae (Bechyně, 1948)
- Gonioctena subgeminata (Chen, 1934)
- Gonioctena sundmani (Jacobson, 1901)
- Gonioctena taiwanensis (Achard)
- Gonioctena theae Baviera, 2007
- Gonioctena tonkinensis (Chen, 1934)
- Gonioctena tredecimmaculata (Jacoby, 1888)
- Gonioctena truncaticornis Cho & Borowiec, 2016
- Gonioctena variabilis (Olivier, 1790)
- Gonioctena viminalis (Linnaeus, 1758)
