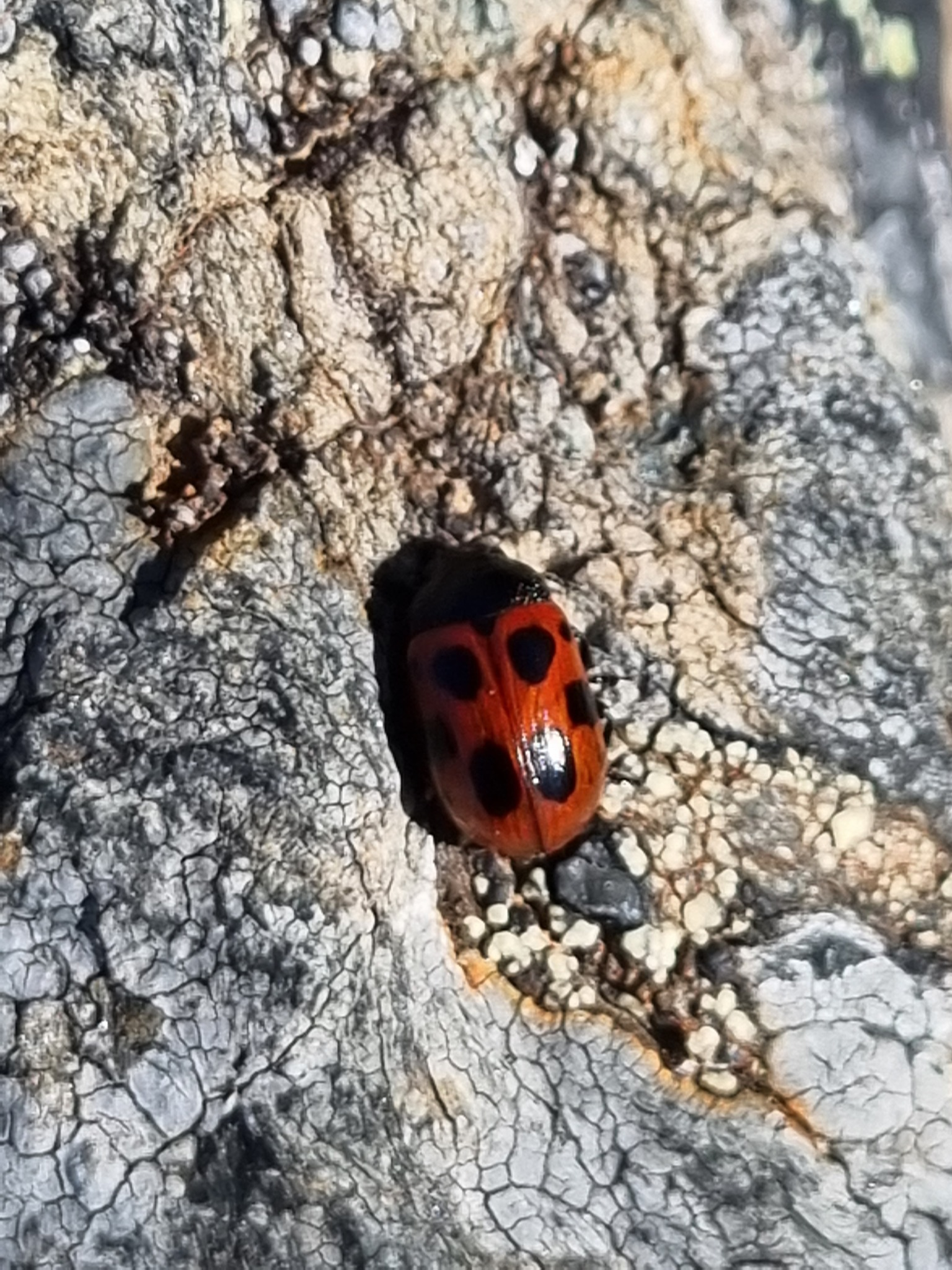
- Gonioctena nivosa, Finland

Scientific classification
- Domain: Eukaryota
- Kingdom: Animalia
- Phylum: Arthropoda
- Class: Insecta
- Order: Coleoptera
- Suborder: Polyphaga
- Infraorder: Cucujiformia
- Family: Chrysomelidae
- Genus: Gonioctena
- Species: G. nivosa

Binomial name
- Gonioctena nivosa Suffrian, 1851

= Gonioctena nivosa =

Species of beetle

Gonioctena nivosa is a species of leaf beetle in the family Chrysomelidae. It is found in Europe and Northern Asia (excluding China).

== Subspecies ==
These three subspecies belong to the species Gonioctena nivosa:

- Gonioctena nivosa alberta Brown, 1952
- Gonioctena nivosa arctica Mannerheim, 1853
- Gonioctena nivosa nivosa
