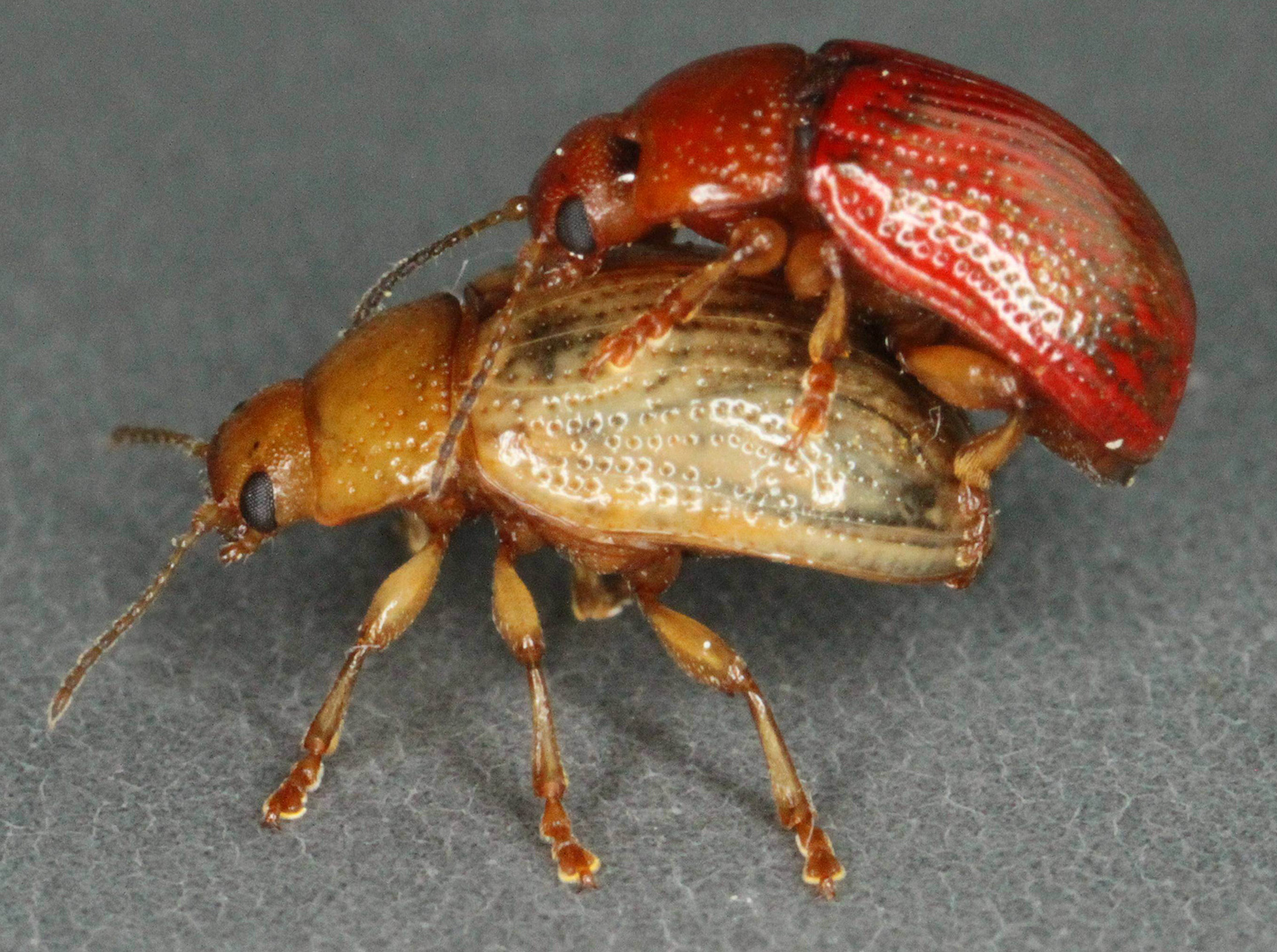

Scientific classification
- Kingdom: Animalia
- Phylum: Arthropoda
- Class: Insecta
- Order: Coleoptera
- Suborder: Polyphaga
- Infraorder: Cucujiformia
- Family: Chrysomelidae
- Subfamily: Chrysomelinae
- Tribe: Chrysomelini
- Genus: Gonioctena
- Species: G. pallida

Binomial name
- Gonioctena pallida ( Linnaeus, 1758)

= Gonioctena pallida =

Species of beetle

Gonioctena pallida is a species of leaf beetle native to Europe.
