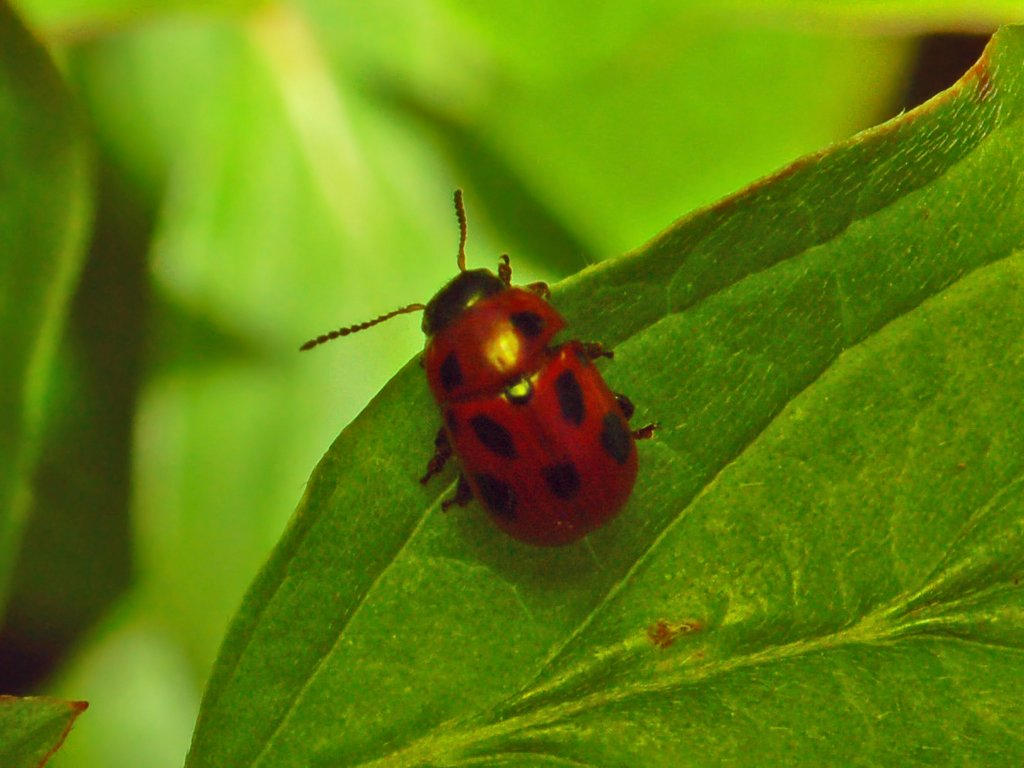
- Upperside
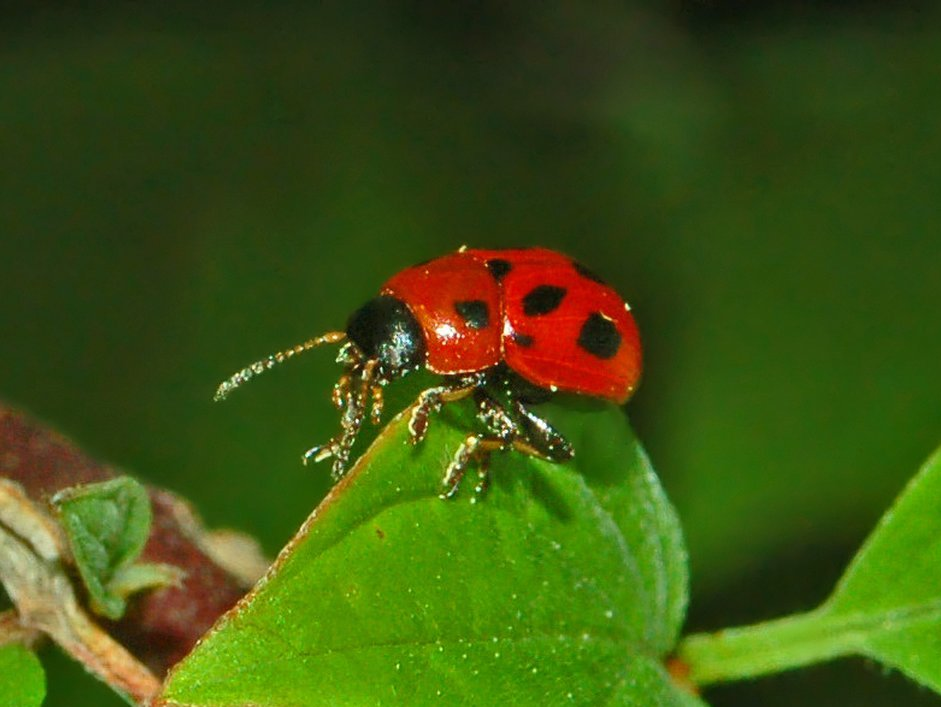
- Side view

Scientific classification
- Kingdom: Animalia
- Phylum: Arthropoda
- Class: Insecta
- Order: Coleoptera
- Suborder: Polyphaga
- Infraorder: Cucujiformia
- Family: Chrysomelidae
- Genus: Gonioctena
- Species: G. fornicata

Binomial name
- Gonioctena fornicata (Brüggemann, 1873)

Synonyms
- Spartoxena fornicata

= Gonioctena fornicata =

Species of beetle

Gonioctena fornicata is a species of broad-shouldered leaf beetles belonging to the family Chrysomelidae, subfamily Chrysomelinae.

== Subspecies ==
- Spartoxena fornicata fornicata (Bruggemann, 1873)

== Distribution ==
This species is mainly found in Poland, Italy, South Russia, Albania, Bosnia, Croatia, Czech Republic, Bulgaria, Greece, North Macedonia, Romania, Jugoslavia, Southern Poland, Ukraine, Southern Russia, Turkey and Caucasus.

== Description ==
These beetles are 6–7 mm long, the head is black, elytra and pronotum are red, with two black dots on the pronotum and five black dots on the elytra. The larvae are yellow-gray, with black spots on the back and sides and three pairs of thoracic legs.

== Biology ==
It is a univoltine species. It overwinters as an adult in the ground. After mating, the females lay their eggs on the leaves. The larvae develop in about 3–4 weeks. The new generation of adult beetles appears at the beginning of spring. Both beetles and larvae mainly feed on the tender leaves and stem of the alfalfa plant (Medicago sativa), Trifolium and other Fabaceae species.

== Damages control ==
Generally chemical control using insecticides is not suggested but trials were done anyway. Unfortunately the field application of Bacillus thuringiensis subs. tenebrionis (Btt) is not possible due to lack of registration (e.g. in Italy). The good efficacy of the Btt preparation on adults and larvae was tested in lab. The microbial control with Btt could be very useful in alfalfa open fields on the contrary the chemical insecticides (e.g. neonicotinoids, etc.) due to the negative side effects on beneficial insects (very numerous in alfalfa) must be avoided.
