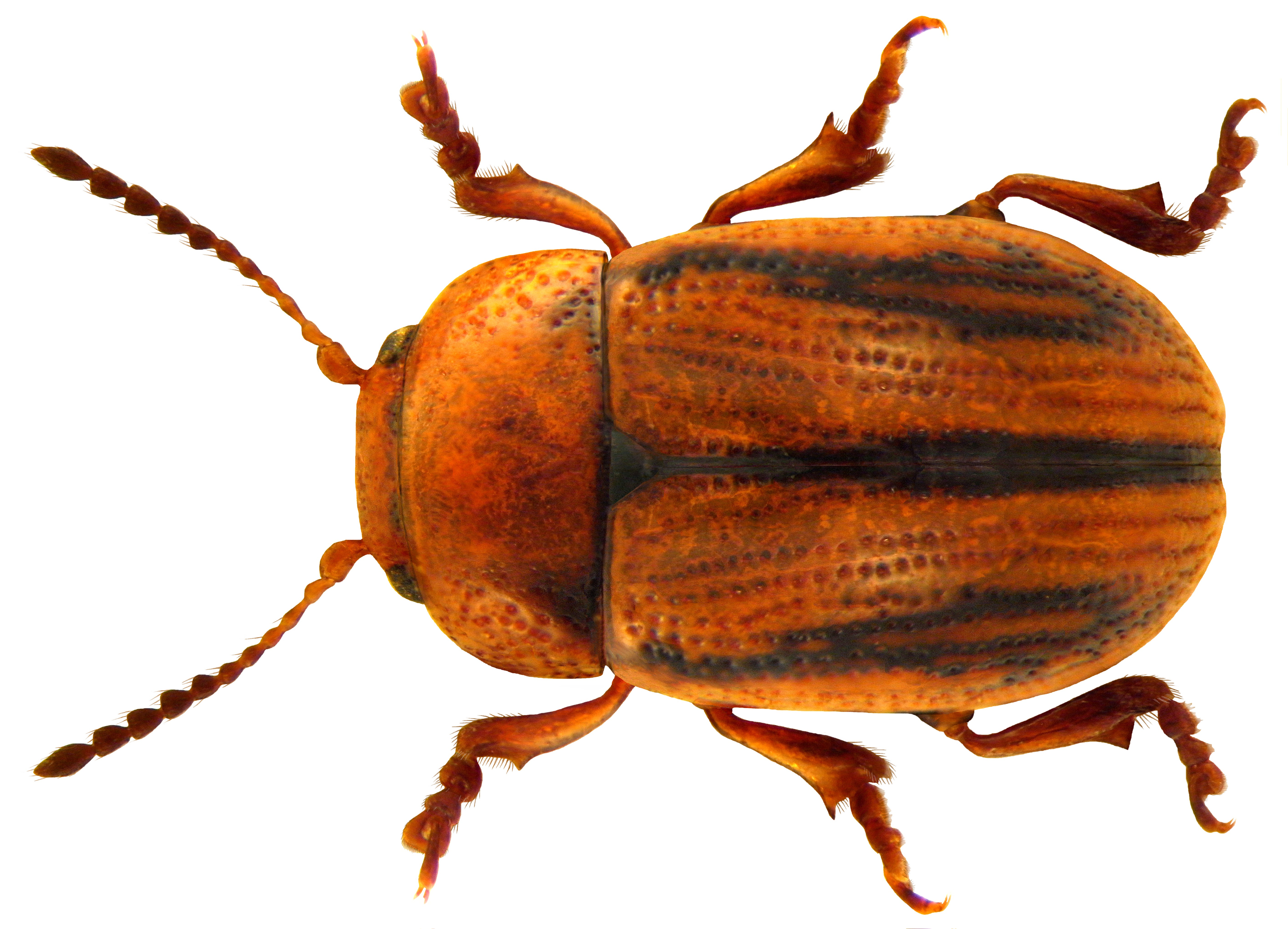

Scientific classification
- Domain: Eukaryota
- Kingdom: Animalia
- Phylum: Arthropoda
- Class: Insecta
- Order: Coleoptera
- Suborder: Polyphaga
- Infraorder: Cucujiformia
- Family: Chrysomelidae
- Subfamily: Chrysomelinae
- Tribe: Chrysomelini
- Genus: Gonioctena
- Species: G. olivacea

Binomial name
- Gonioctena olivacea (Forster, 1771)

= Gonioctena olivacea =

Species of beetle

Gonioctena olivacea is a species of leaf beetle native to Europe.
