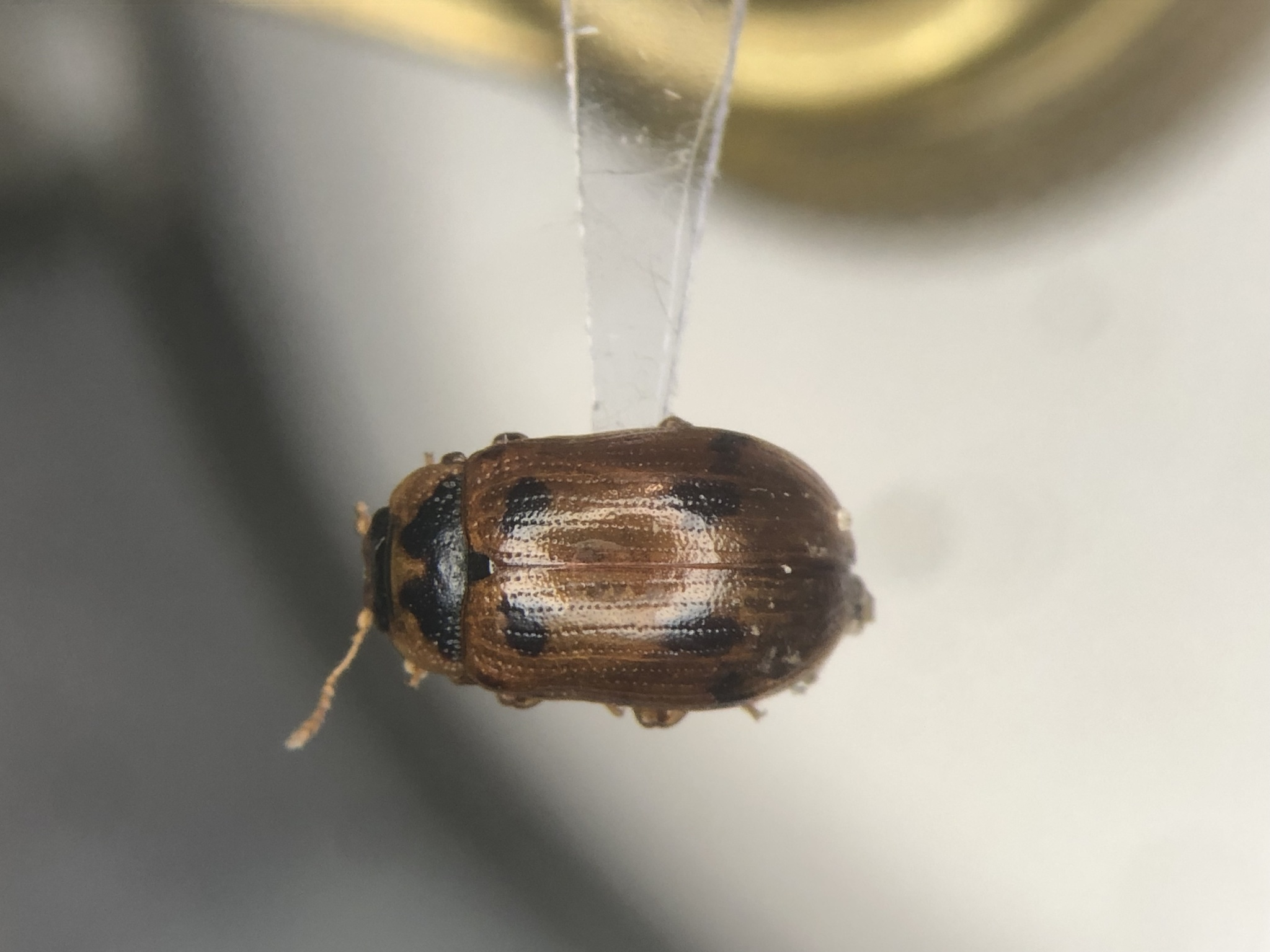
- Gonioctena americana, Canada

Scientific classification
- Domain: Eukaryota
- Kingdom: Animalia
- Phylum: Arthropoda
- Class: Insecta
- Order: Coleoptera
- Suborder: Polyphaga
- Infraorder: Cucujiformia
- Family: Chrysomelidae
- Genus: Gonioctena
- Species: G. americana

Binomial name
- Gonioctena americana Schaeffer, 1924

= Gonioctena americana =

Species of beetle

Gonioctena americana, the American aspen beetle, is a species of leaf beetle in the family Chrysomelidae. It is found in North America.
