= Gonioctena notmani =

Scientific classification
- Domain: Eukaryota
- Kingdom: Animalia
- Phylum: Arthropoda
- Class: Insecta
- Order: Coleoptera
- Suborder: Polyphaga
- Infraorder: Cucujiformia
- Family: Chrysomelidae
- Genus: Gonioctena
- Species: G. notmani

Binomial name
- Gonioctena notmani (Schaeffer, 1924)

Species of beetle

Gonioctena notmani is a species of leaf beetle in the family Chrysomelidae.
