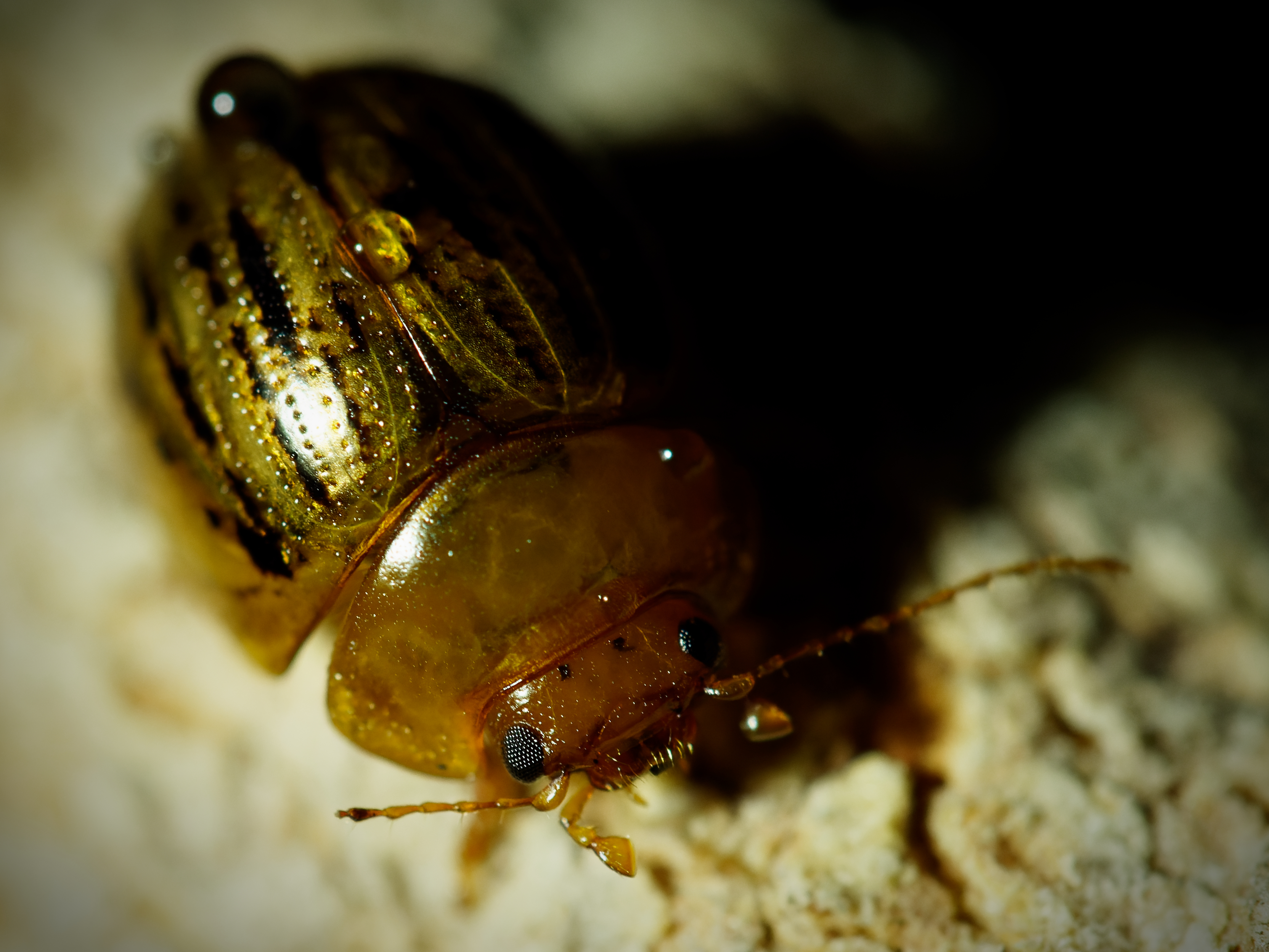
- in Kensington Bushland Reserve, WA

Scientific classification
- Domain: Eukaryota
- Kingdom: Animalia
- Phylum: Arthropoda
- Class: Insecta
- Order: Coleoptera
- Suborder: Polyphaga
- Infraorder: Cucujiformia
- Family: Chrysomelidae
- Genus: Peltoschema
- Species: P. nigroconspersa

Binomial name
- Peltoschema nigroconspersa (Clark, 1865)

Synonyms
- Paropsis nigroconspersa Clark, 1865

= Peltoschema nigroconspersa =

Species of beetle

Peltoschema nigroconspersa is a species of beetle in the leaf beetle family (Chrysomelidae). It was first described in 1865 as Paropsis nigroconspersa by Hamlet Clark.
