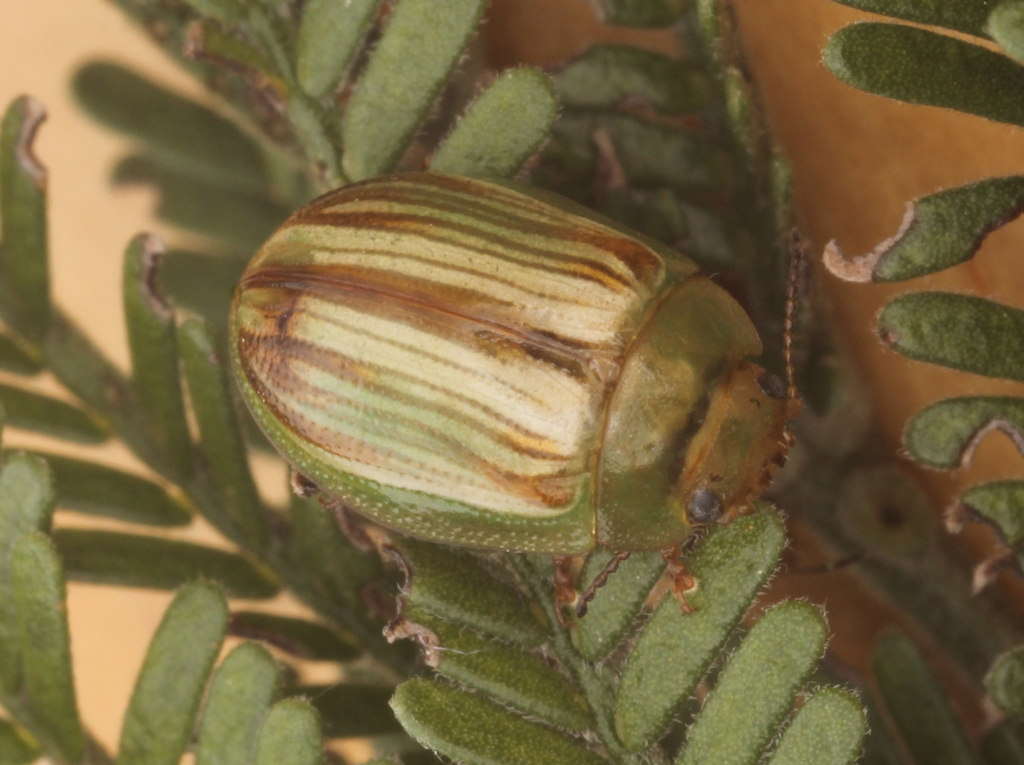
- Peltoschema orphana Fireblight beetle

Scientific classification
- Kingdom: Animalia
- Phylum: Arthropoda
- Clade: Pancrustacea
- Class: Insecta
- Order: Coleoptera
- Suborder: Polyphaga
- Infraorder: Cucujiformia
- Family: Chrysomelidae
- Subfamily: Chrysomelinae
- Genus: Peltoschema; Reitter, 1880

Species
- See text for complete list

= Peltoschema =

Genus of beetles

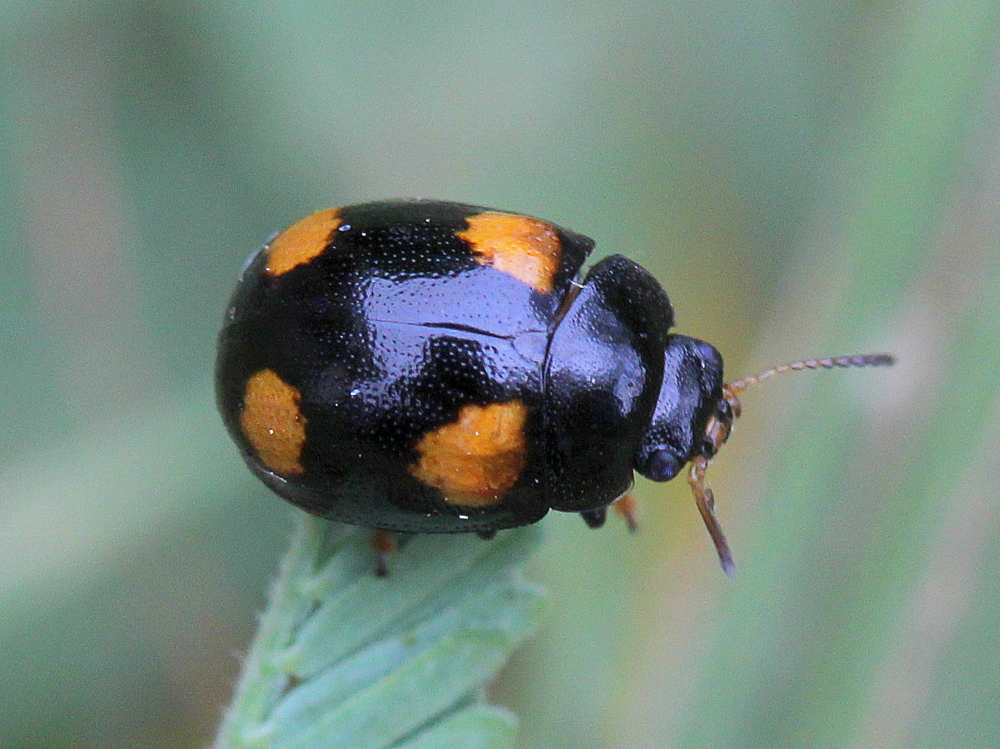
Peltoschema tetraspilota

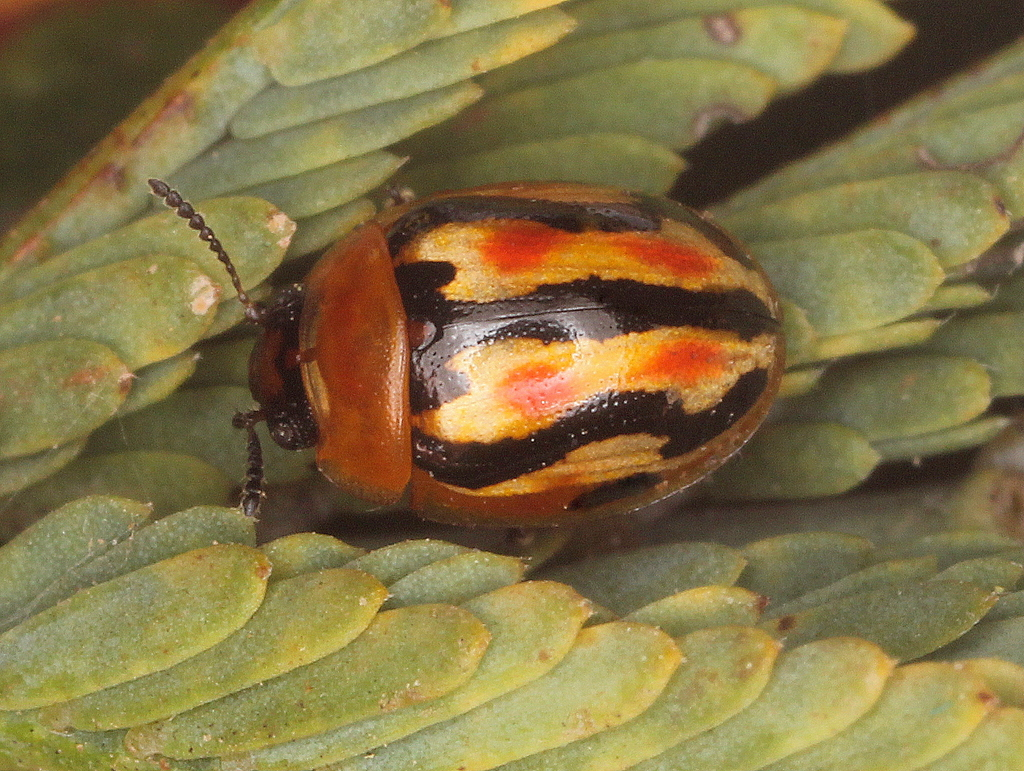
Peltoschema trilineata

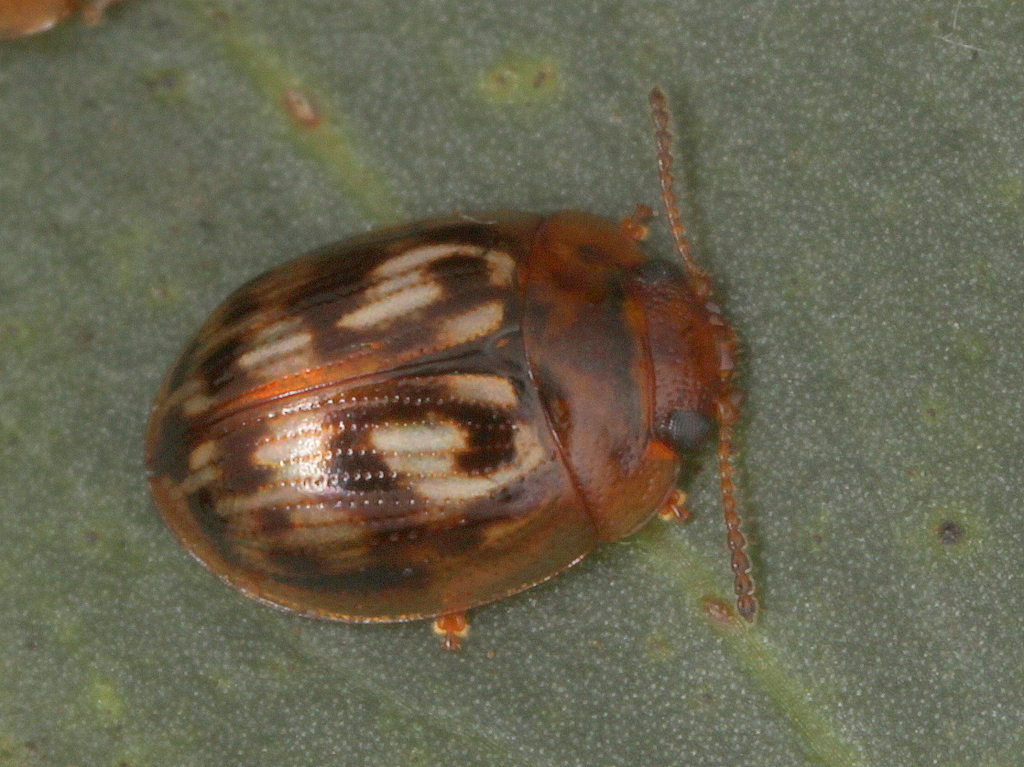
Peltoschema delicula

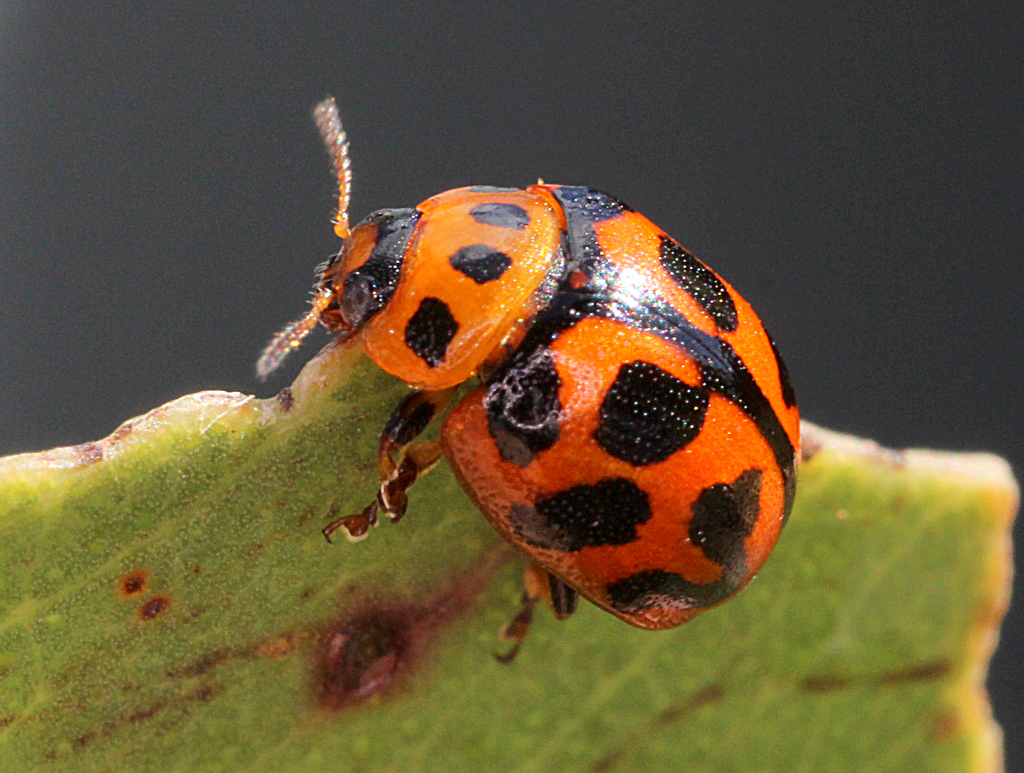
peltoschema oceanica

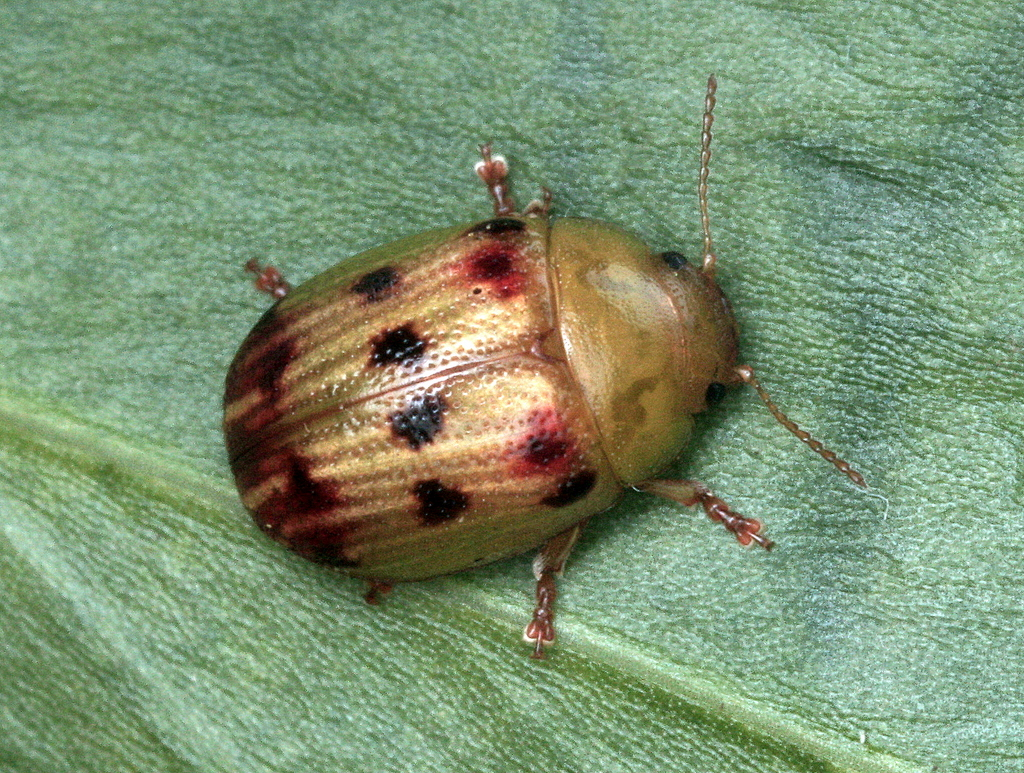
Peltoschema rubiginosa

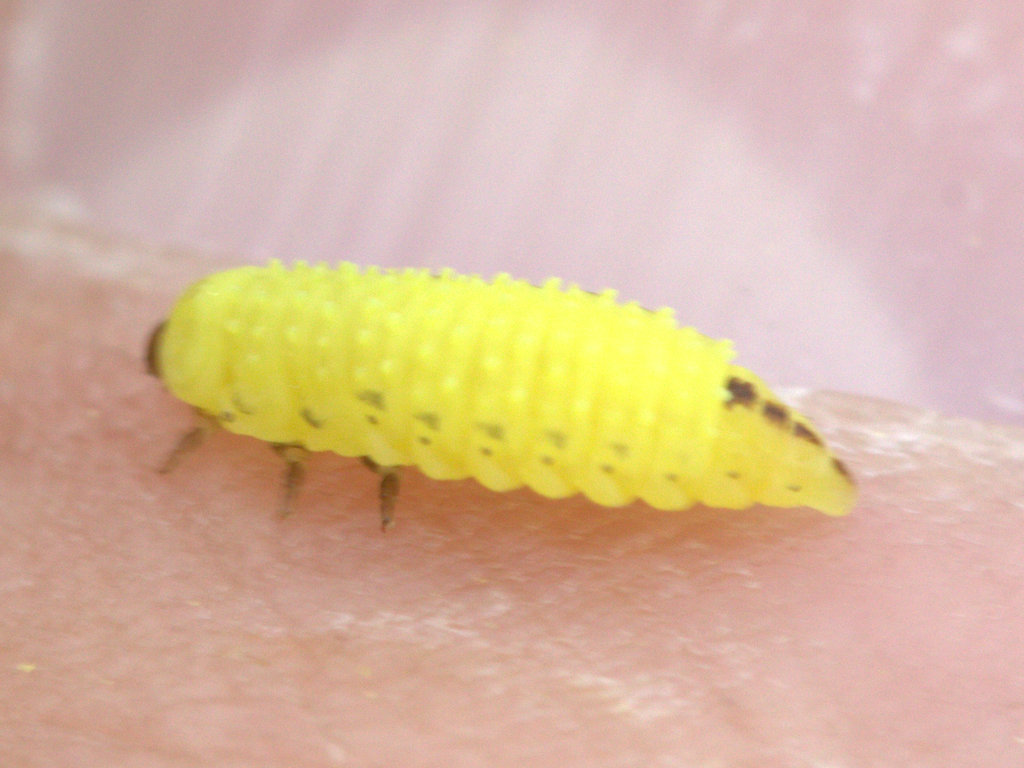
Peltoschema hamadryas larva

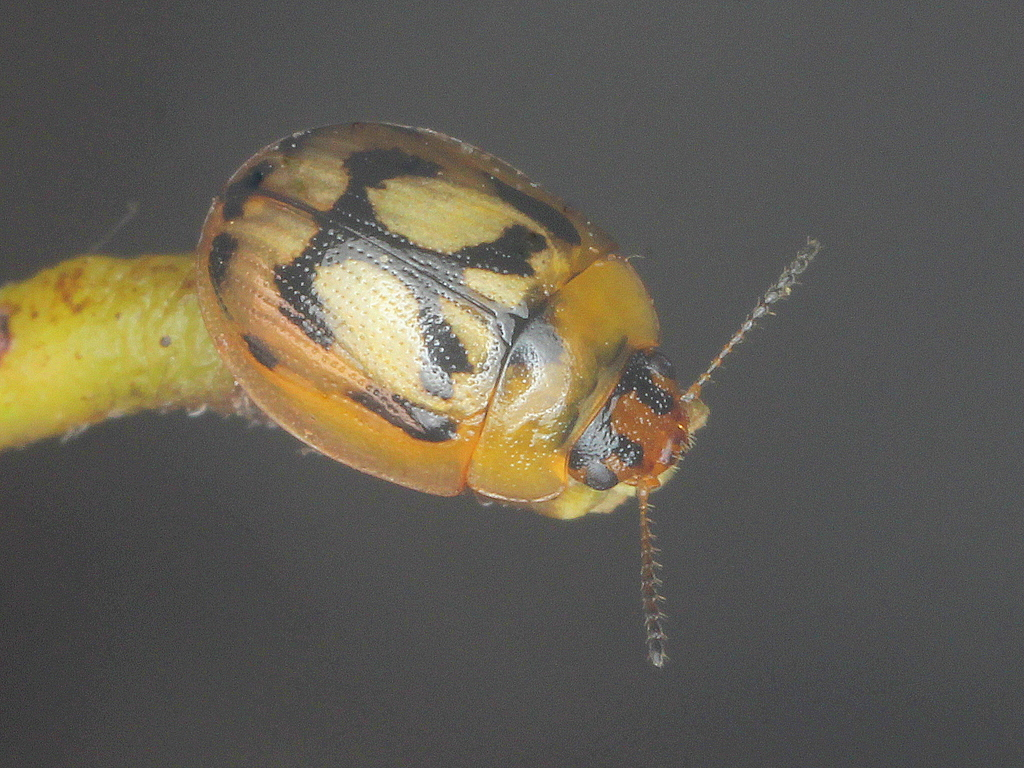
Peltoschema hamadryas

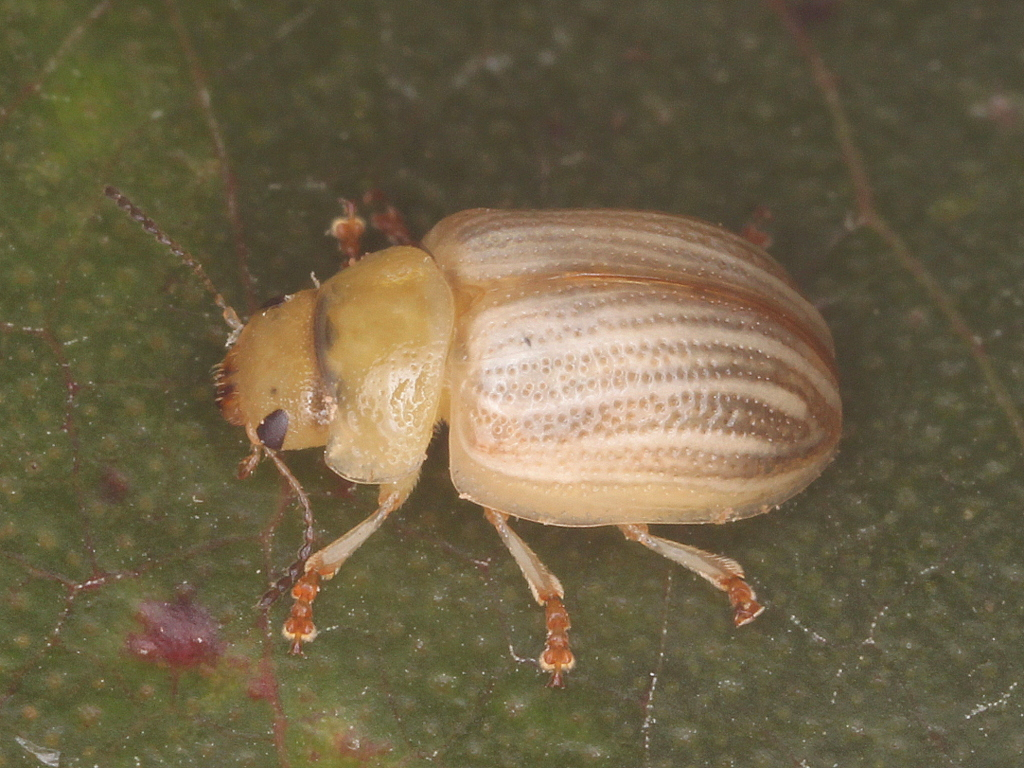
Peltoschema sp

Peltoschema is a genus of leaf beetles in the family Chrysomelidae. This genus contains about 94 species. Some mimic ladybird beetles and others are pests and can cause serious defoliation of their host plants. Peltoschema orphana (the fireblight beetle) can defoliate and kill populations of silver wattle. and badly damage Acacia mearnsii. Peltoschema suturalis is native to Australia and another pest of Acacias.

== Taxonomy ==
The genus was first described by Edmund Reitter in 1880, with the type species being Peltoschema filicornis, by monotypy, and was redescribed in 2001 by Reid and Slipinski. The taxonomic decision for the synonymy of Acacicola Lea, 1903, Pyrgoides, and Pyrgo is based on Reid and Slipinski's 2001 paper.

== Distribution ==
Beetles of this genus are found in all states and territories of Australia.

== Host plants ==
Host plants include not only plants in the genera Acacia and Daviesia in the Fabaceae family, but also plants in the Myrtaceae and Apocynaceae families.

== Species ==
- Peltoschema amabilis
- Peltoschema anxia
- Peltoschema apicata
- Peltoschema arethusa
- Peltoschema basicollis
- Peltoschema brevifrons
- Peltoschema bunyamontis
- Peltoschema calomeloides
- Peltoschema caloptera
- Peltoschema carbonata
- Peltoschema cardinalis
- Peltoschema clio
- Peltoschema cooki
- Peltoschema daphne
- Peltoschema delicatula
- Peltoschema depressa
- Peltoschema didyma
- Peltoschema dimidiata
- Peltoschema discoidalis
- Peltoschema dryope
- Peltoschema erythrocephala
- Peltoschema excisipennis
- Peltoschema eyrensis
- Peltoschema festiva
- Peltoschema filicornis
- Peltoschema flavoinclusa
- Peltoschema fuscitarsis
- Peltoschema haematosticta
- Peltoschema hamadryas
- Peltoschema hera
- Peltoschema immaculicollis
- Peltoschema infirma
- Peltoschema irene
- Peltoschema isolata
- Peltoschema jucunda
- Peltoschema lepida
- Peltoschema livida
- Peltoschema longula
- Peltoschema lucidula
- Peltoschema lucina
- Peltoschema macrosticta
- Peltoschema maculiventris
- Peltoschema mansueta
- Peltoschema medea
- Peltoschema medioflava
- Peltoschema mediorufa
- Peltoschema mediovittata
- Peltoschema mitis
- Peltoschema mjoebergi
- Peltoschema modesta
- Peltoschema navicula
- Peltoschema nigritula
- Peltoschema nigroconspersa
- Peltoschema nigropicta
- Peltoschema niobe
- Peltoschema notata
- Peltoschema obtusata
- Peltoschema oceanica
- Peltoschema oenone
- Peltoschema orphana
- Peltoschema pallidula
- Peltoschema pandora
- Peltoschema partita
- Peltoschema perplexa
- Peltoschema platycephala
- Peltoschema posticalis
- Peltoschema prosternalis
- Peltoschema pulchella
- Peltoschema quadrizonata
- Peltoschema rostralis
- Peltoschema rubiginosa
- Peltoschema rufopicta
- Peltoschema scaphula
- Peltoschema scutellata
- Peltoschema scutifera
- Peltoschema spectabilis
- Peltoschema stillatipennis
- Peltoschema subaenescens
- Peltoschema subapicalis
- Peltoschema substriata
- Peltoschema suturalis
- Peltoschema suturella
- Peltoschema tarsalis
- Peltoschema tetraspilota
- Peltoschema tricosa
- Peltoschema trilineata
- Peltoschema turbata
- Peltoschema venusta
- Peltoschema venustula
- Peltoschema verticalis
- Peltoschema vesta
- Peltoschema vicina
- Peltoschema virens
- Peltoschema viridula
- Peltoschema ziczac
