= Peltoschema festiva =

Scientific classification
- Domain: Eukaryota
- Kingdom: Animalia
- Phylum: Arthropoda
- Class: Insecta
- Order: Coleoptera
- Suborder: Polyphaga
- Infraorder: Cucujiformia
- Family: Chrysomelidae
- Genus: Peltoschema
- Species: P. festiva

Binomial name
- Peltoschema festiva (Chapuis, 1877)

Species of beetle

Peltoschema festiva is a species of leaf beetle in the family Chrysomelidae. It is found in Australia.
