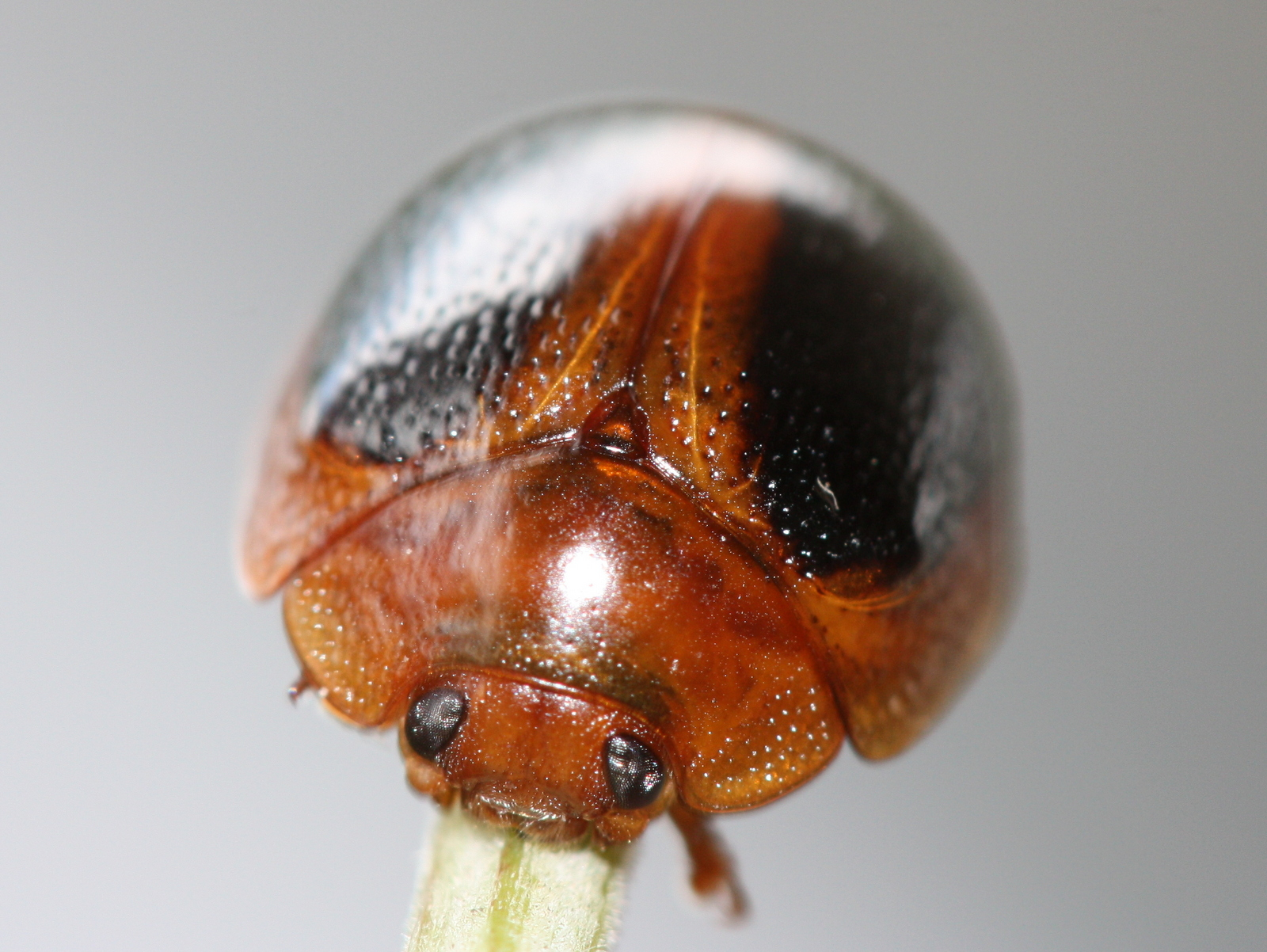
- Dicranosterna immaculata

Scientific classification
- Kingdom: Animalia
- Phylum: Arthropoda
- Class: Insecta
- Order: Coleoptera
- Suborder: Polyphaga
- Infraorder: Cucujiformia
- Family: Chrysomelidae
- Subfamily: Chrysomelinae
- Genus: Dicranosterna; Motschulsky, 1860

Species
- Dicranosterna immaculata; Dicranosterna picea; Dicranosterna semipunctata; See text for complete list

= Dicranosterna =

Genus of beetles

Dicranosterna is a genus of leaf beetles, in the subfamily Chrysomelinae.

These beetles are hemispherical and the larvae are globular (spherical). The elytra have coarse punctures which are non striate (non aligned).

There are 36 species and they occur throughout Australia.

Dicranosterna is endemic to Australia. Host-plant is Acacia The record for Eucalyptus (Jolivet and Hawkeswood 1995) is erroneous (Reid 2002c). Larvae are globular, with inconspicuous setae and a pair of dorsal glands, and lack apicoventral (rear) pseudopoda (prolegs).

== Gallery ==
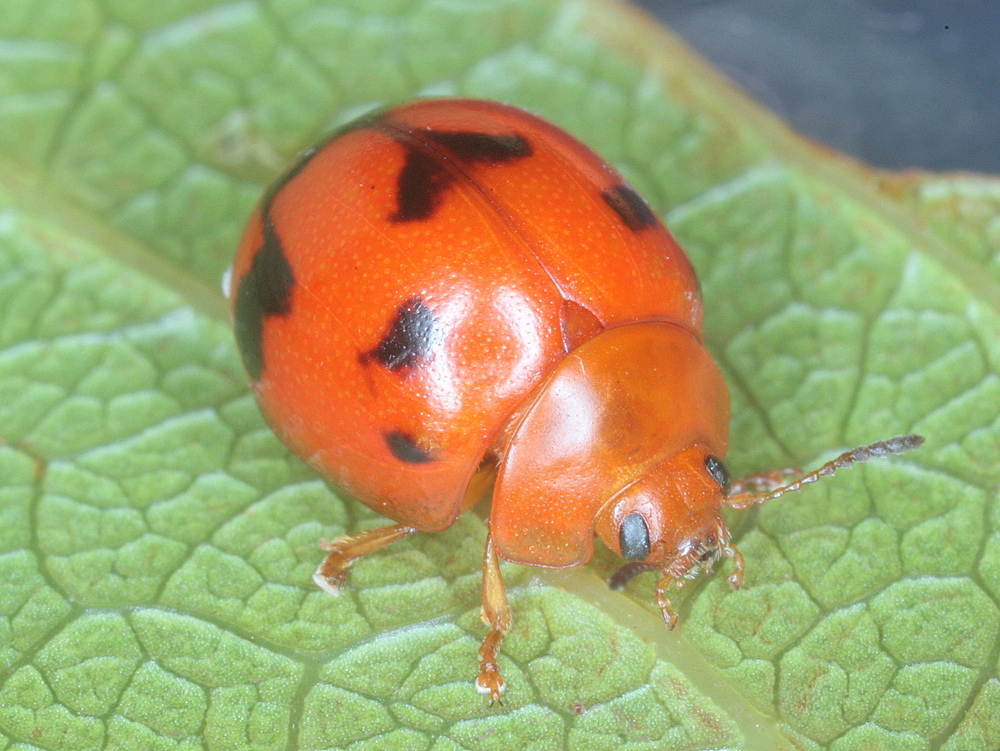
Dicranosterna vexabilis

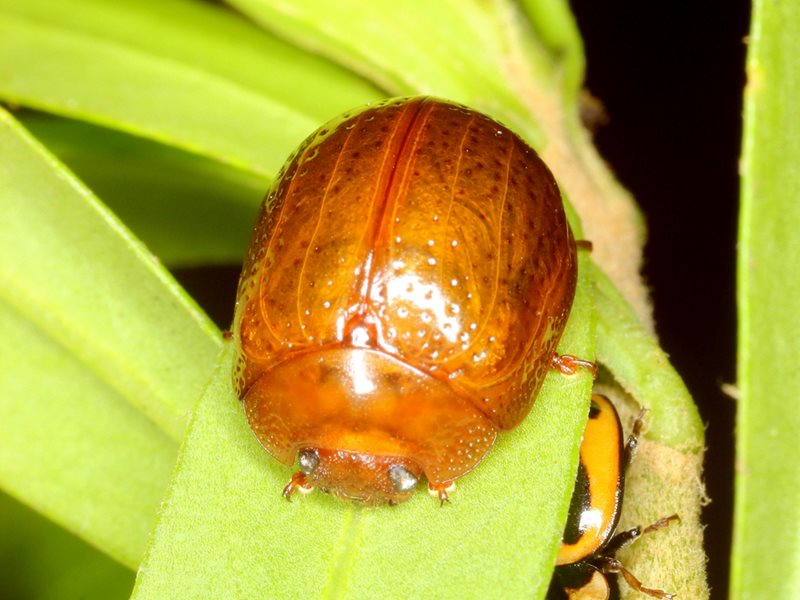
Dicranosterna semipunctata

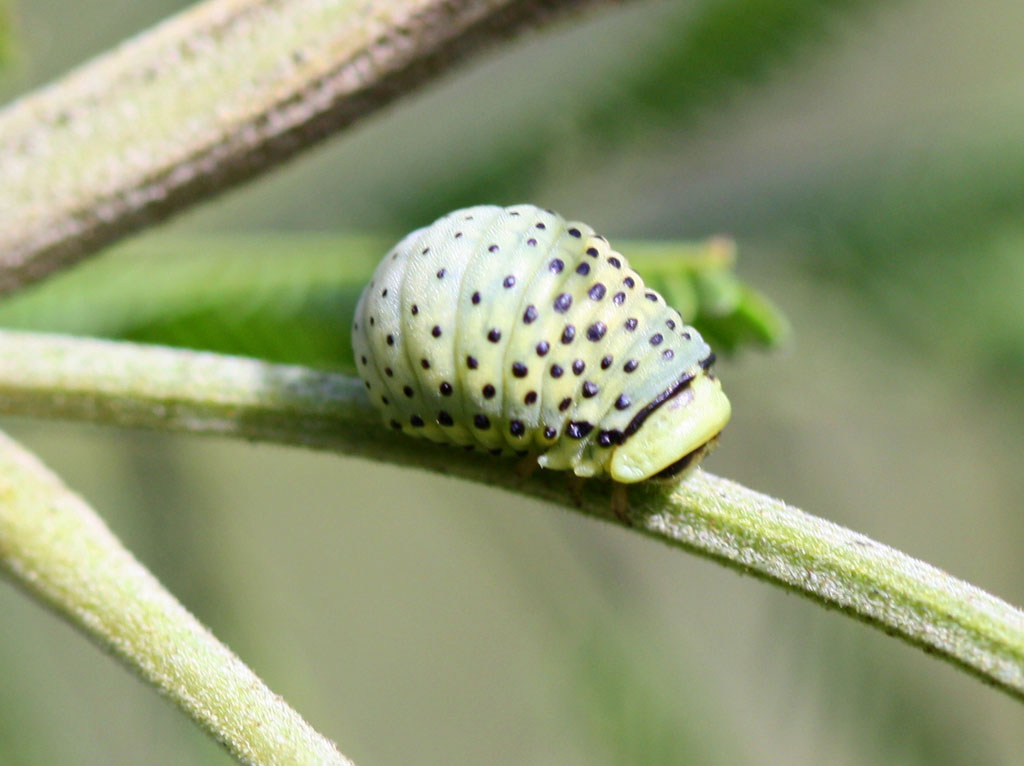
Dicranosterna immaculata larva

== Species ==
- Dicranosterna abdominalis Chapuis, 1877
- Dicranosterna aeraria (Chapuis, 1877)
- Dicranosterna alessandrae (Daccordi, 2005)
- Dicranosterna bicolor (Daccordi, 2003)
- Dicranosterna bipuncticollis (Chapuis, 1877)
- Dicranosterna circe (Stål, 1860)
- Dicranosterna coccinelloides (Olivier, 1807)
- Dicranosterna contracta (Chapuis, 1877)
- Dicranosterna foraminosa (Chapuis, 1877)
- Dicranosterna globata (Chapuis, 1877)
- Dicranosterna globulosa (Chapuis, 1877)
- Dicranosterna hastata (Chapuis, 1877)
- Dicranosterna hemisphaerica (Chapuis, 1877)
- Dicranosterna immaculata (Marsham, 1808)
- Dicranosterna lateralis (Blackburn, 1893)
- Dicranosterna limbata (Weise, 1917)
- Dicranosterna mimulav (Blackburn, 1890)
- Dicranosterna ngarinmana (Daccordi, 2003)
- Dicranosterna nigrosuturalis (Lea, 1924)
- Dicranosterna novemlineata (Lea, 1924)
- Dicranosterna oblonga (Chapuis, 1877)
- Dicranosterna palmensis (Blackburn, 1896)
- Dicranosterna picea (Olivier, 1807)
- Dicranosterna prolixa (Weise, 1917)
- Dicranosterna rubeola (Chapuis, 1877)
- Dicranosterna ruffoi Daccordi, 2003
- Dicranosterna selene (Blackburn, 1901)
- Dicranosterna semipunctata (Chapuis, 1877)
- Dicranosterna septentrionalis (Weise, 1917)
- Dicranosterna stali (Chapuis, 1877)
- Dicranosterna subaeraria (Lea, 1924)
- Dicranosterna subovalis (Chapuis, 1877)
- Dicranosterna trimorpha (Lea, 1924)
- Dicranosterna umbrata (Chapuis, 1877)
- Dicranosterna valica Daccordi, 2003
- Dicranosterna vexabilis Weise, 1917
