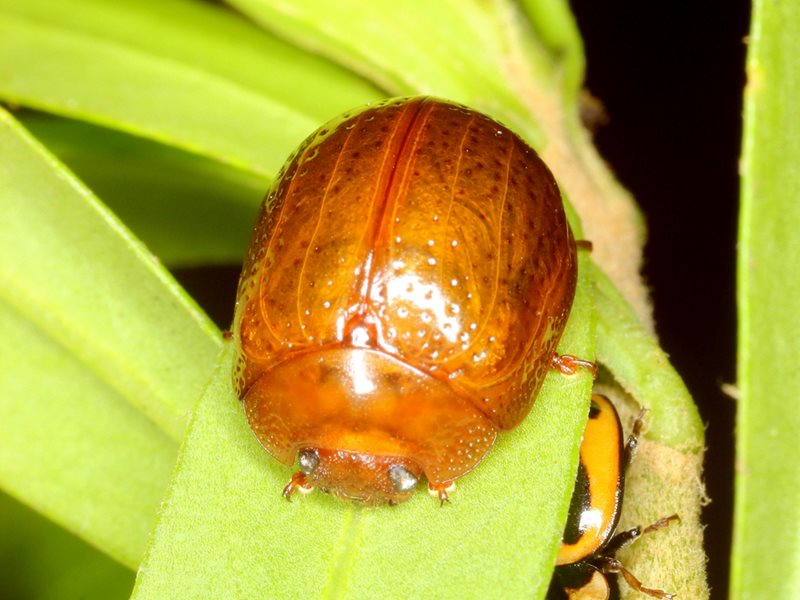

Scientific classification
- Kingdom: Animalia
- Phylum: Arthropoda
- Class: Insecta
- Order: Coleoptera
- Suborder: Polyphaga
- Infraorder: Cucujiformia
- Family: Chrysomelidae
- Genus: Dicranosterna
- Species: D. semipunctata

Binomial name
- Dicranosterna semipunctata (Chapuis, 1877)

= Dicranosterna semipunctata =

Species of beetle

Dicranosterna semipunctata is a species of leaf beetle common in NSW and Victoria, (SE Australia). It is a honey brown color, strongly convex and feeds on phyllodes Acacia such as blackwood Acacia melanoxylon. In New Zealand it has become a potential problem for the trees and biological controls have been investigated.
