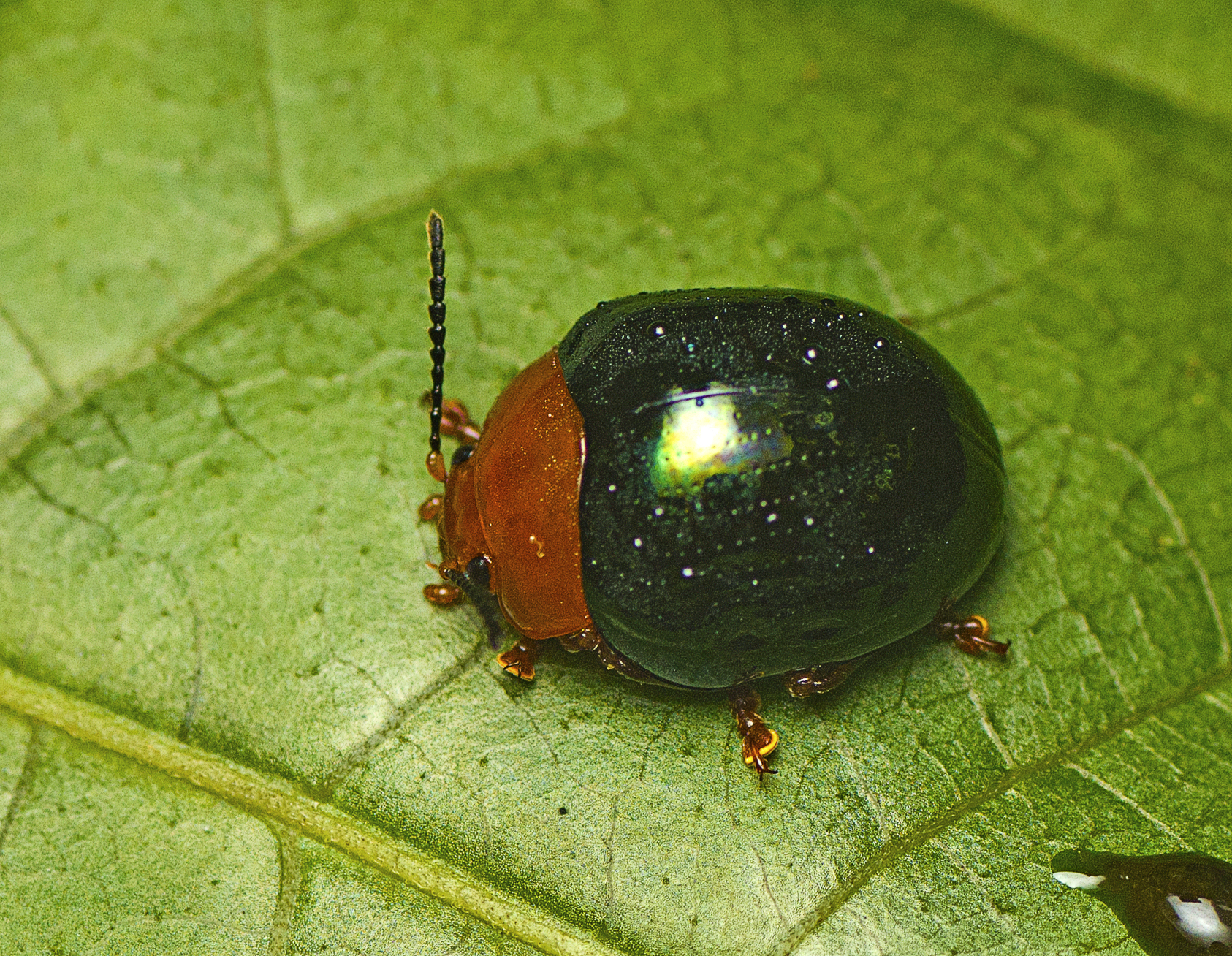
- Chalcomela nitida

Scientific classification
- Domain: Eukaryota
- Kingdom: Animalia
- Phylum: Arthropoda
- Class: Insecta
- Order: Coleoptera
- Suborder: Polyphaga
- Infraorder: Cucujiformia
- Family: Chrysomelidae
- Subfamily: Chrysomelinae
- Genus: Chalcomela; Baly, 1856

Synonyms
- Cyclomela Baly, 1856; Micromela Baly, 1856

= Chalcomela =

Genusof beetle

Chalcomela is a genus of beetle in the family Chrysomelidae. It is found in Australia and New Guinea.

The following species are accepted within Chalcomela:

- Chalcomela aulica Lea, 1929
- Chalcomela ceccoae Daccordi, 2003
- Chalcomela cupripennis (Baly, 1856)
- Chalcomela erythroderes Lea, 1929
- Chalcomela eximia Baly, 1856
- Chalcomela fulvipes Jacoby, 1895
- Chalcomela hexaspila Weise, 1917
- Chalcomela insignis Baly, 1856
- Chalcomela leai Daccordi, 2003
- Chalcomela nigricollis (Lea, 1916)
- Chalcomela nitida (Baly, 1856)
- Chalcomela ornatissima Baly, 1861
- Chalcomela simulans Lea, 1916
- Chalcomela sloanei Blackburn, 1890
- Chalcomela splendens (Macleay, 1826)
- Chalcomela sulcata Baly, 1856
- Chalcomela variegata Jacoby, 1898
- Chalcomela viridimicans Lea, 1903
