= Chalcomela splendens =

Scientific classification
- Domain: Eukaryota
- Kingdom: Animalia
- Phylum: Arthropoda
- Class: Insecta
- Order: Coleoptera
- Suborder: Polyphaga
- Infraorder: Cucujiformia
- Family: Chrysomelidae
- Genus: Chalcomela
- Species: C. splendens

Binomial name
- Chalcomela splendens (Macleay, 1827)

Species of beetle

Chalcomela splendens is a beetle in the Chrysomelidae family, found in South Australia.

It was first described by William Sharp MacLeay in 1827 as Notoclea splendens, and was assigned to the genus, Chalcomela in 2006 by Chris Reid, giving the species name Chalcomela splendens.
