= Crosita elegans =

Scientific classification
- Kingdom: Animalia
- Phylum: Arthropoda
- Class: Insecta
- Order: Coleoptera
- Suborder: Polyphaga
- Infraorder: Cucujiformia
- Family: Chrysomelidae
- Genus: Crosita
- Species: C. elegans

Binomial name
- Crosita elegans Lopatin, 1968

Species of beetle

Crosita elegans is a leaf beetle species in the genus Crosita with a Palaearctic distribution.
