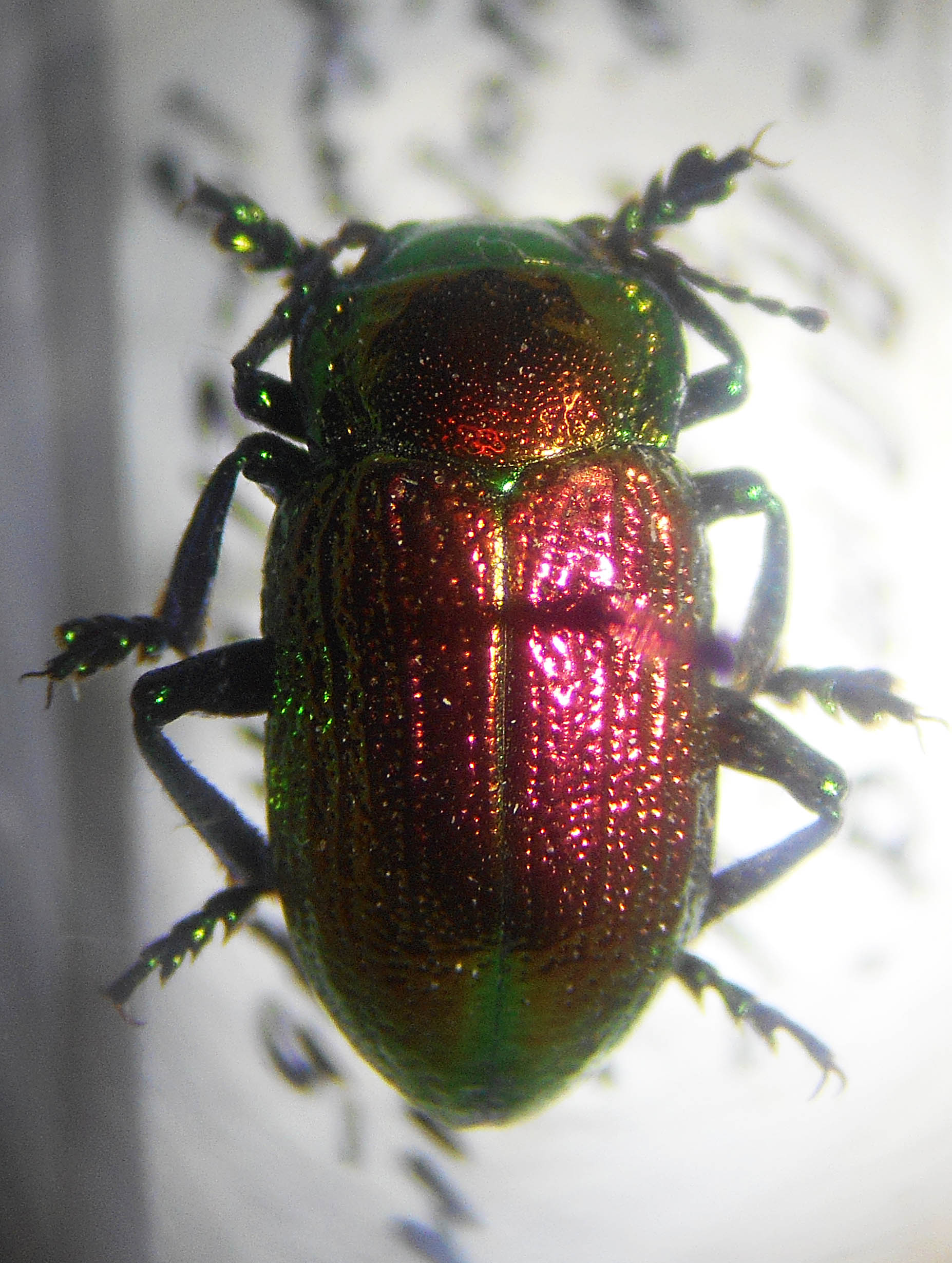
- Crosita clementzae

Scientific classification
- Kingdom: Animalia
- Phylum: Arthropoda
- Class: Insecta
- Order: Coleoptera
- Suborder: Polyphaga
- Infraorder: Cucujiformia
- Family: Chrysomelidae
- Subfamily: Chrysomelinae
- Genus: Crosita; Motschulsky, 1860

Species
- see text

= Crosita =

Genus of beetles

Crosita is a leaf beetle genus in the sub family Chrysomelinae.

== Species ==
- C. afghanica
- C. altaica
- C. atasica
- C. barkulica
- C. bogutensis
- C. borochorensis
- C. clementzae
- C. elegans
- C. faldermanni
- C. heptapotamica
- C. kaszabi
- C. kowalewskyi
- C. kozlovi
- C. matronula
- C. maximovitschi
- C. pigra
- C. rugulosa
- C. urumchiana
