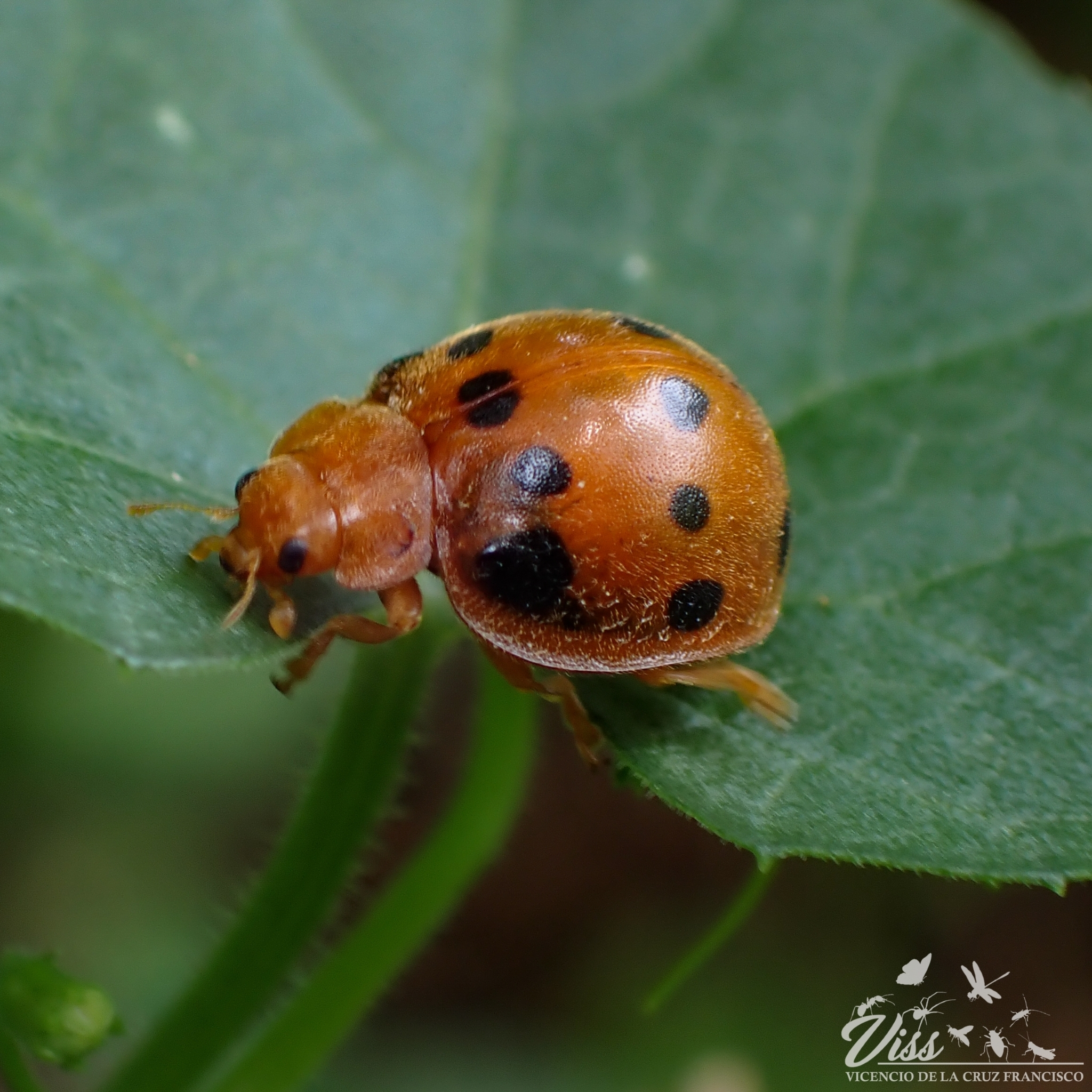
- Epilachna tredecimnotata, México

Scientific classification
- Kingdom: Animalia
- Phylum: Arthropoda
- Class: Insecta
- Order: Coleoptera
- Suborder: Polyphaga
- Infraorder: Cucujiformia
- Family: Coccinellidae
- Subfamily: Coccinellinae
- Tribe: Epilachnini
- Genus: Epilachna; Chevrolat, 1836

Diversity
- more than 500 species

= Epilachna =

Genus of beetles

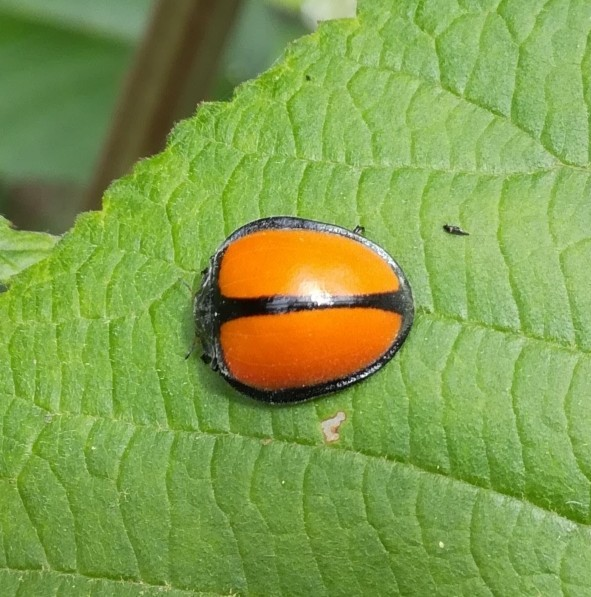
Epilachna abrupta, Panamá

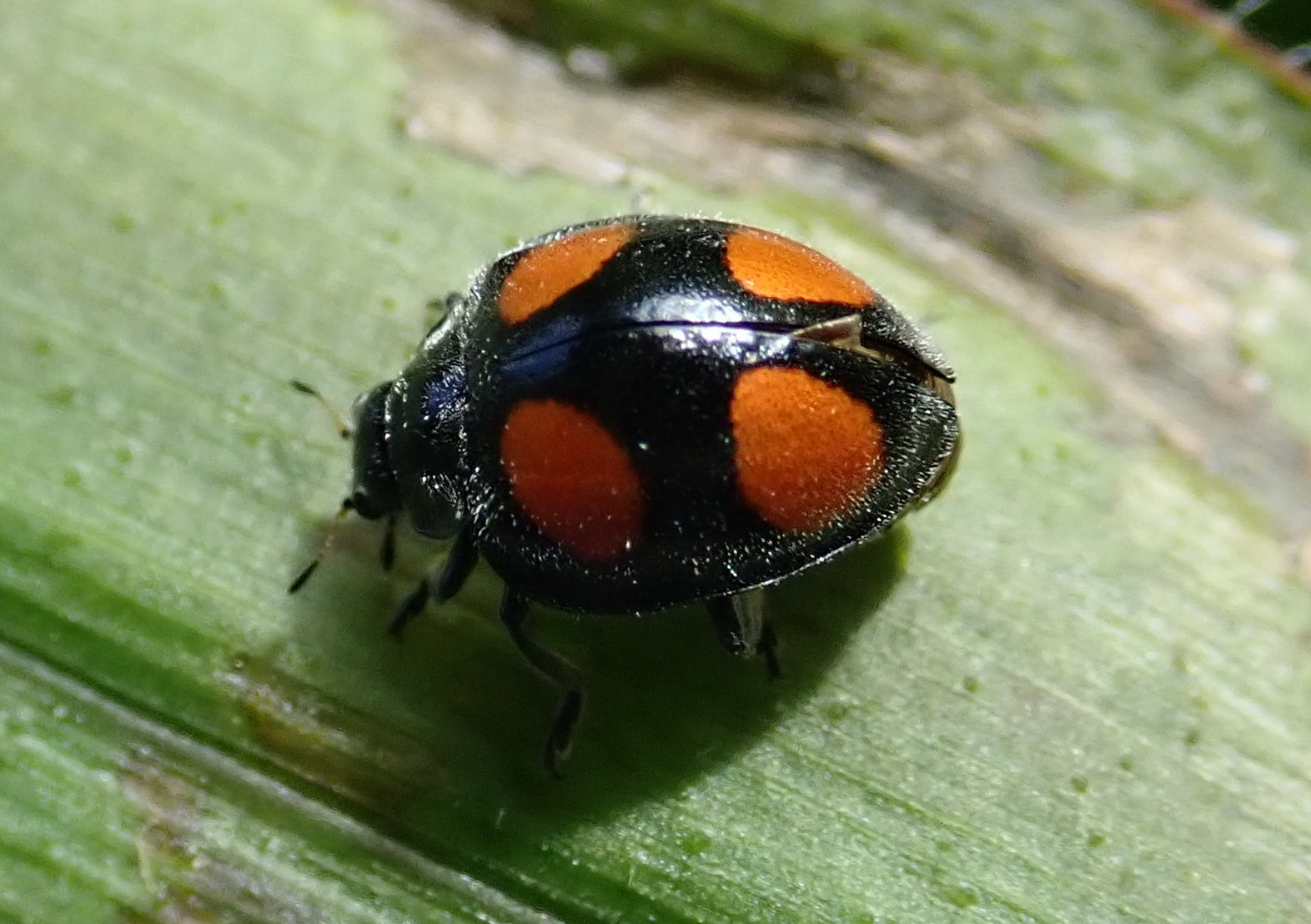
Epilachna aequatorialis, Ecuador

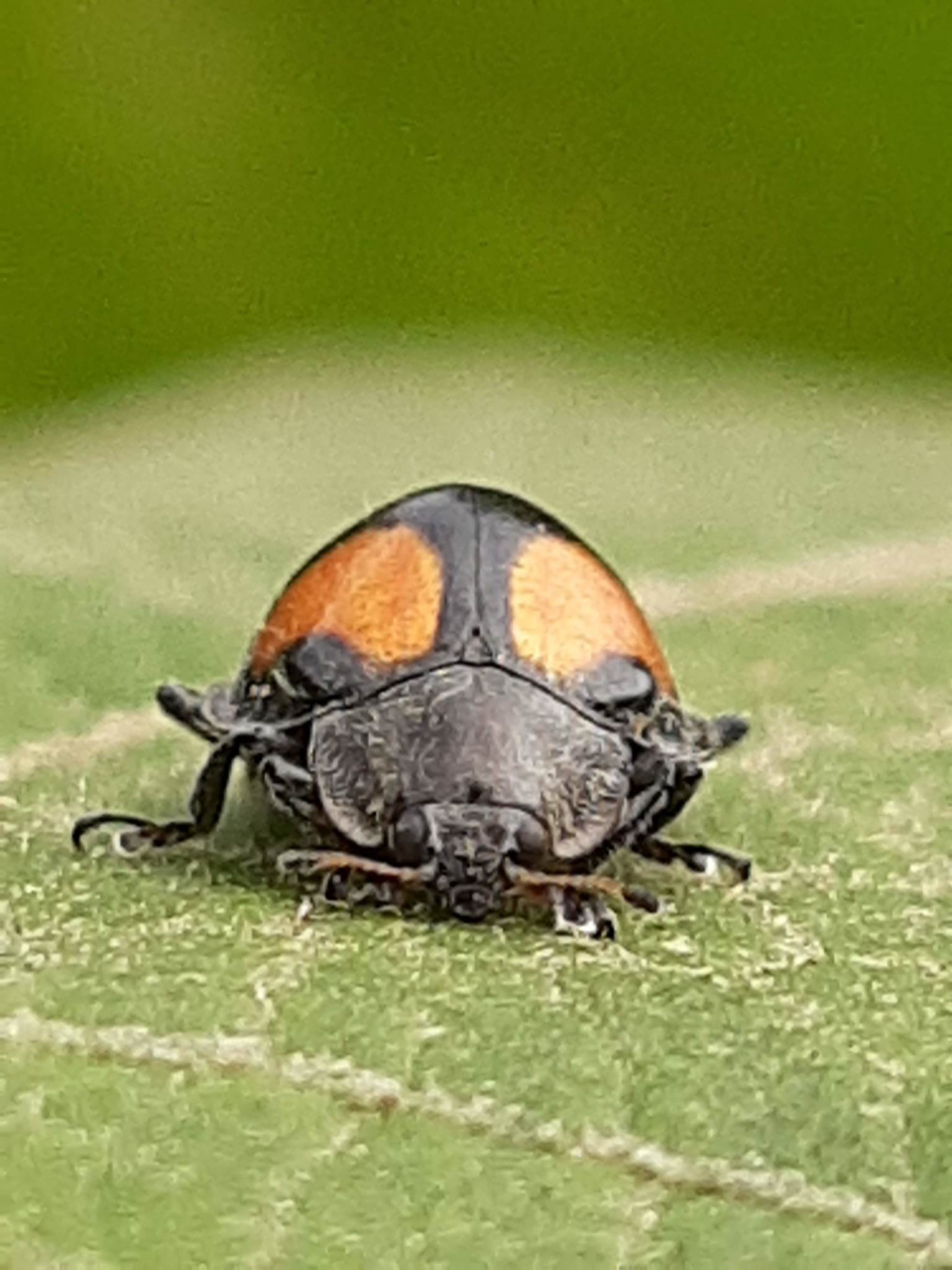
Epilachna angustata, Colombia

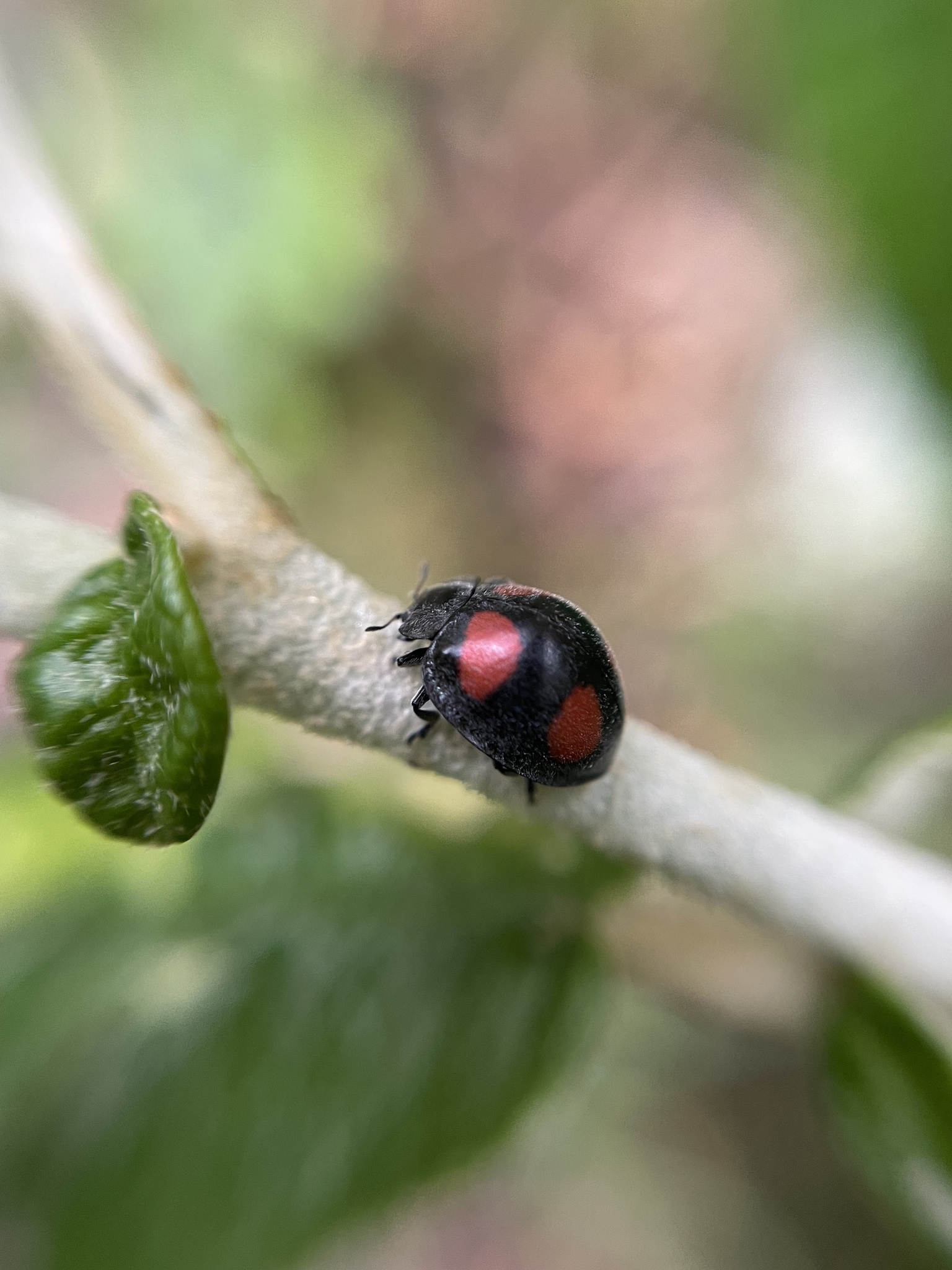
Epilachna approximata, Ecuador

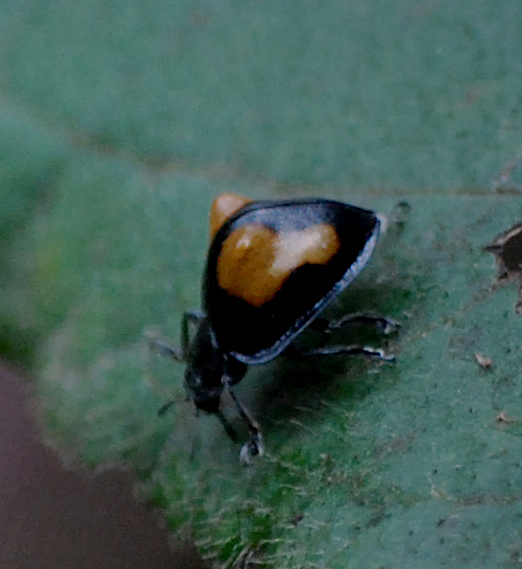
Epilachna bituberculata, Colombia

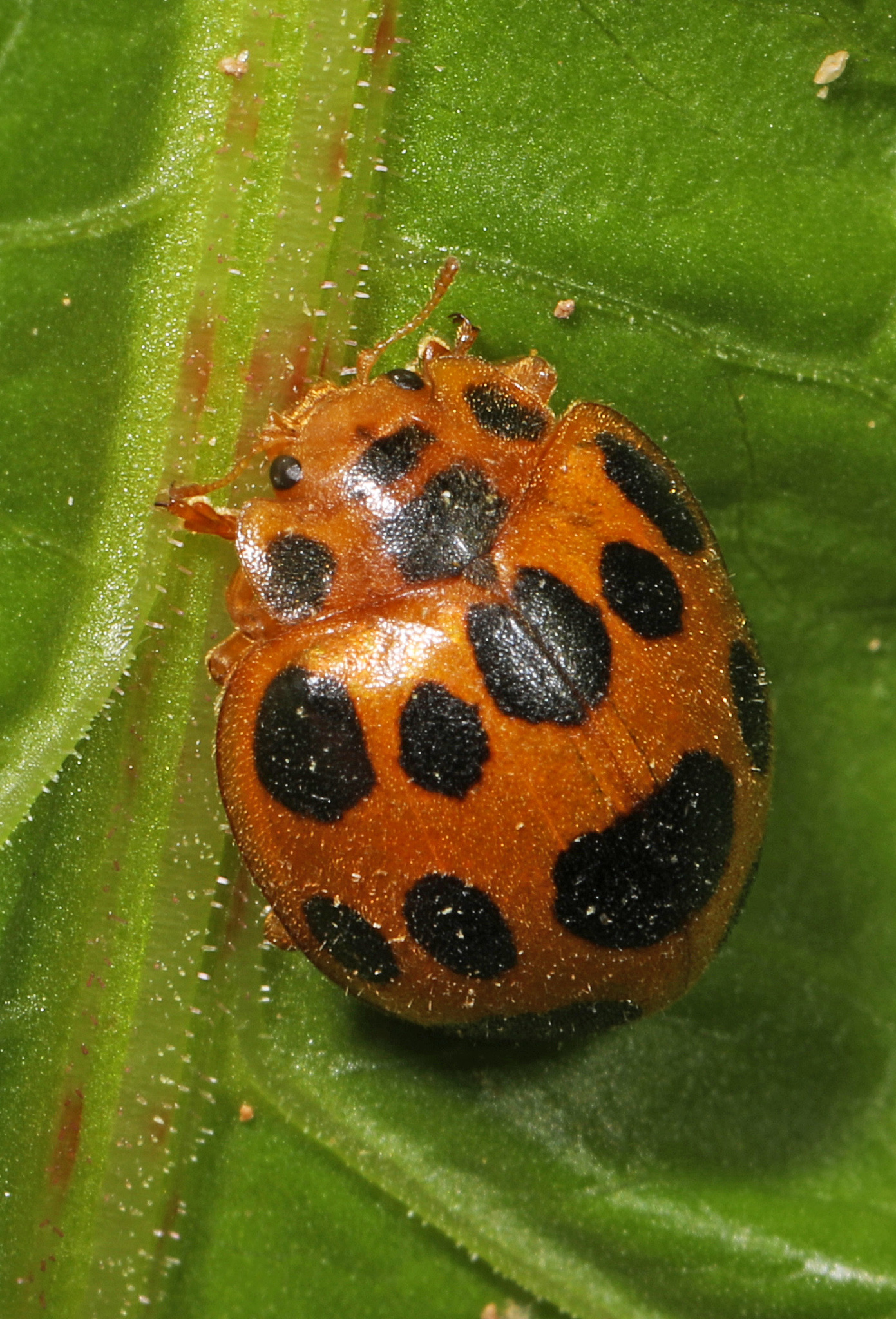
Epilachna borealis, Virginia

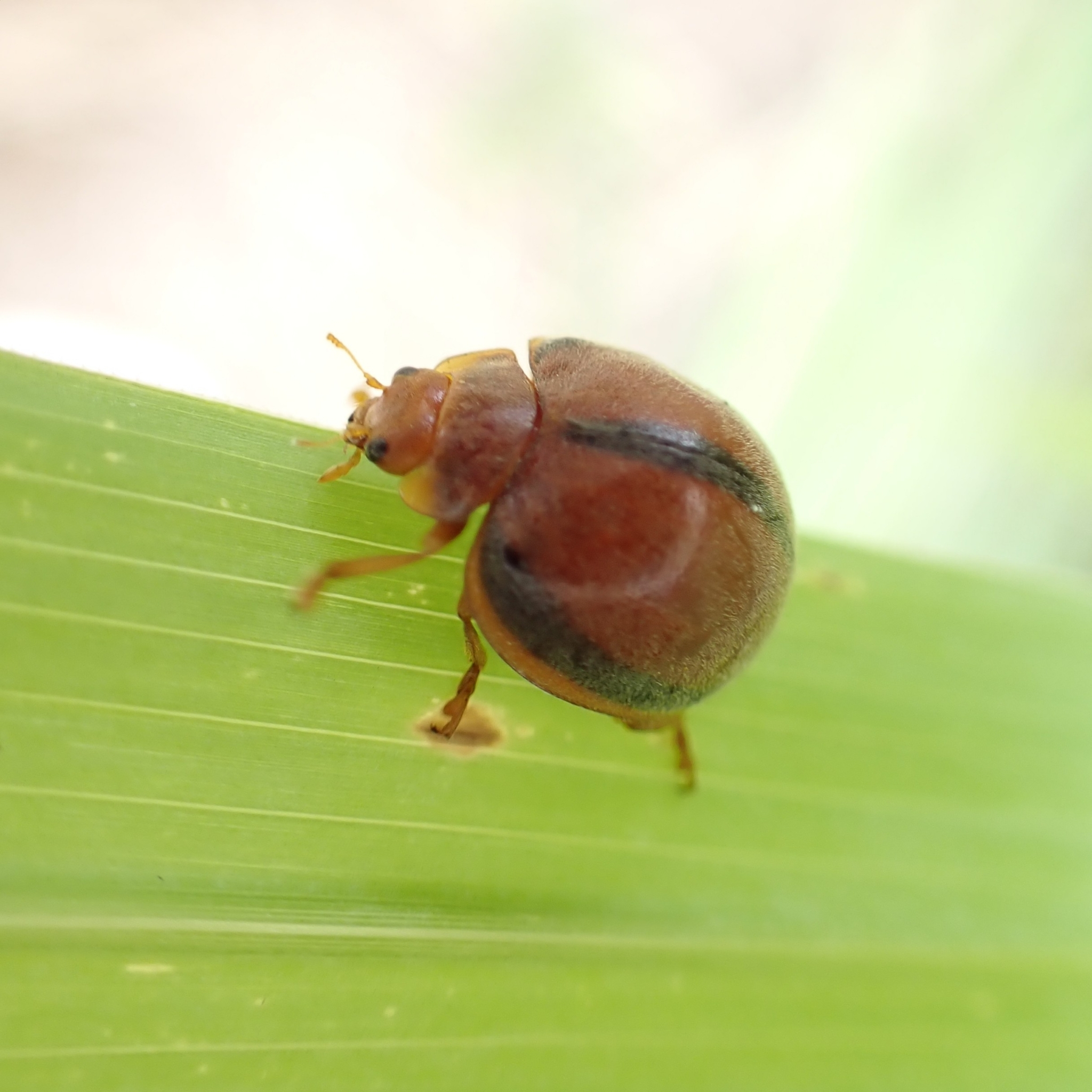
Epilachna cacica, Bolivia

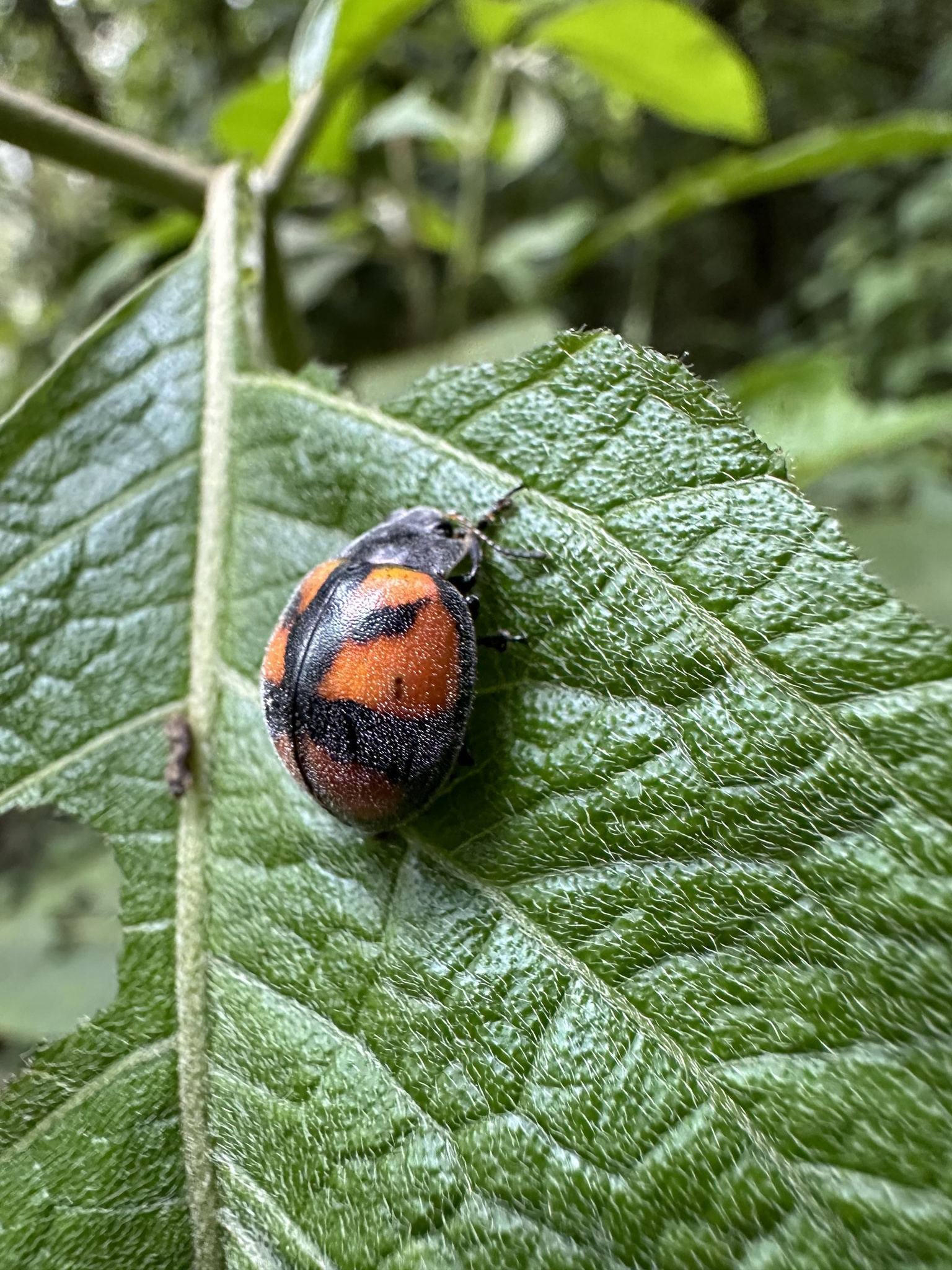
Epilachna cinctipennis, Colombia

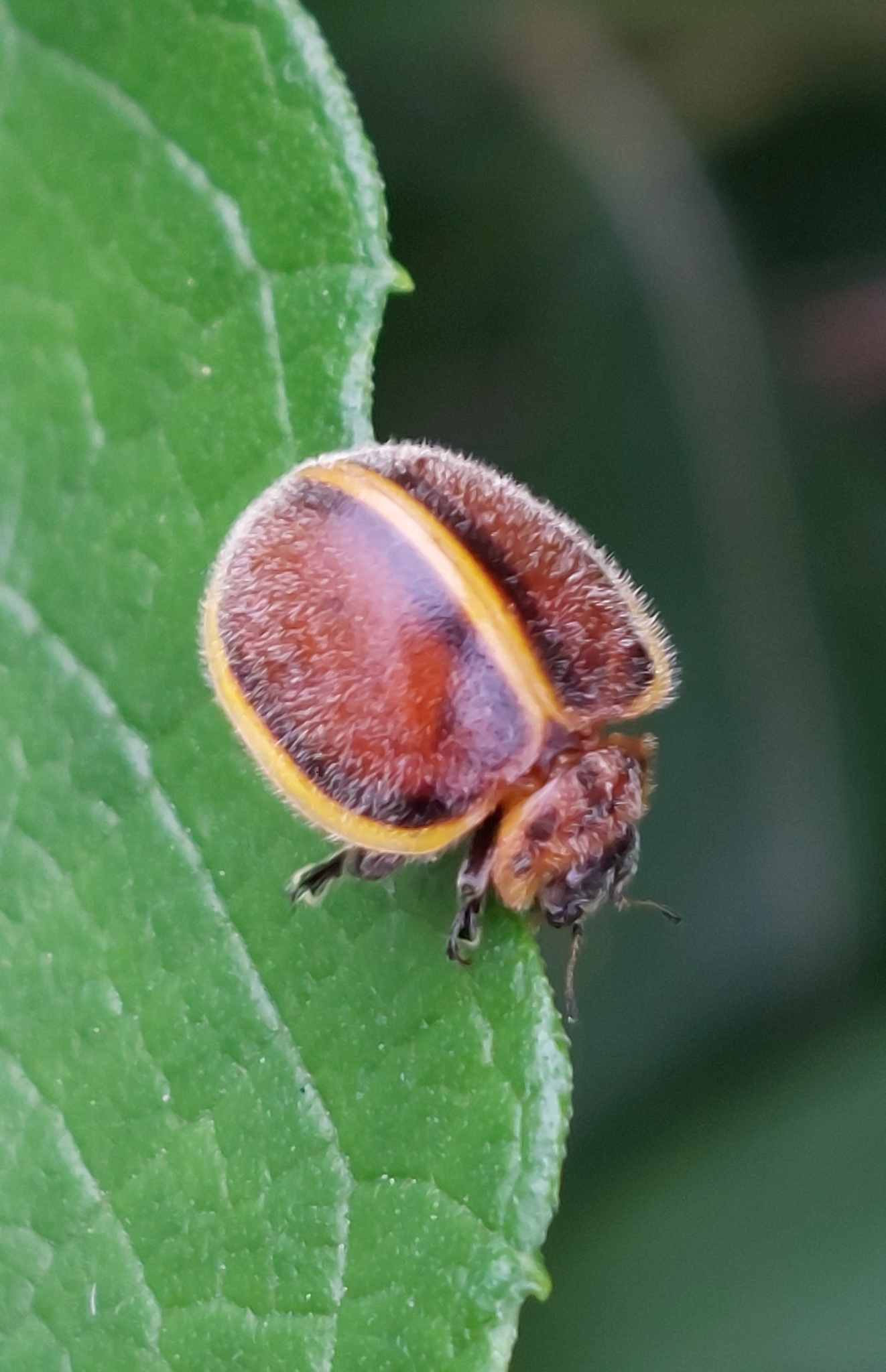
Epilachna circumcincta, Brasil

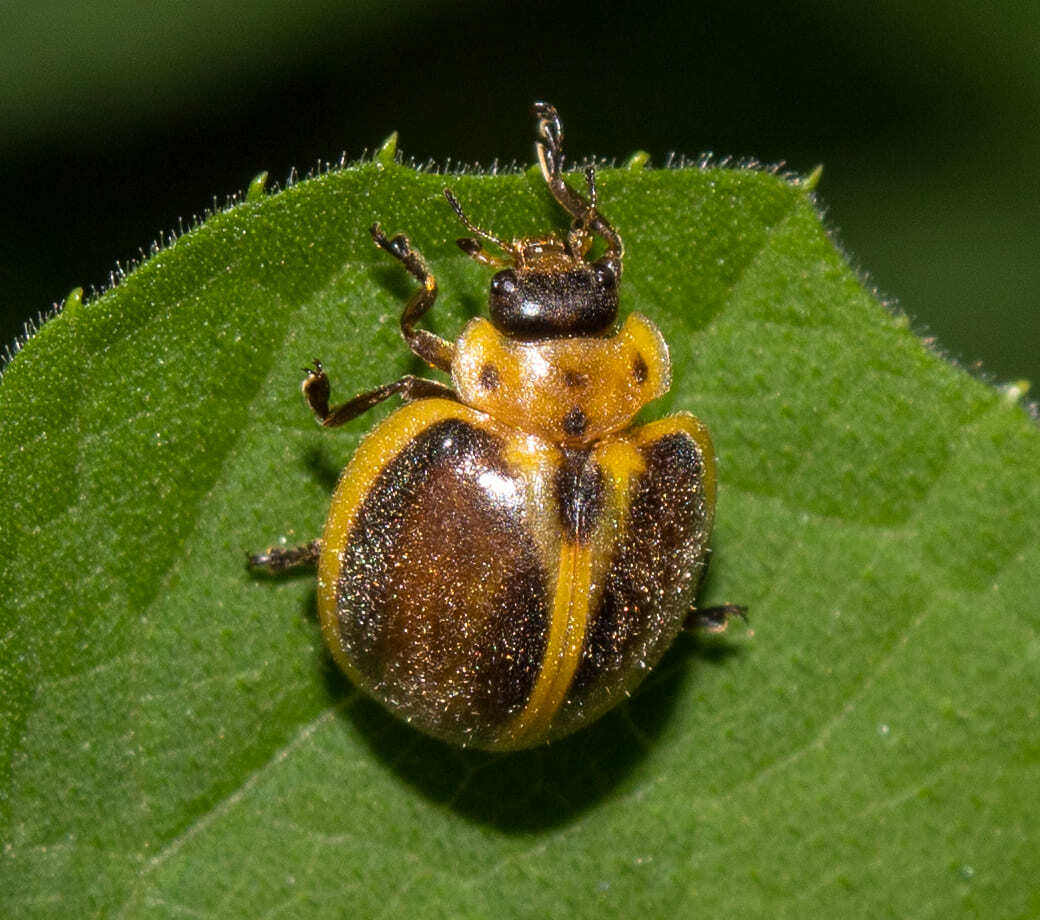
Epilachna clandestina, Brasil

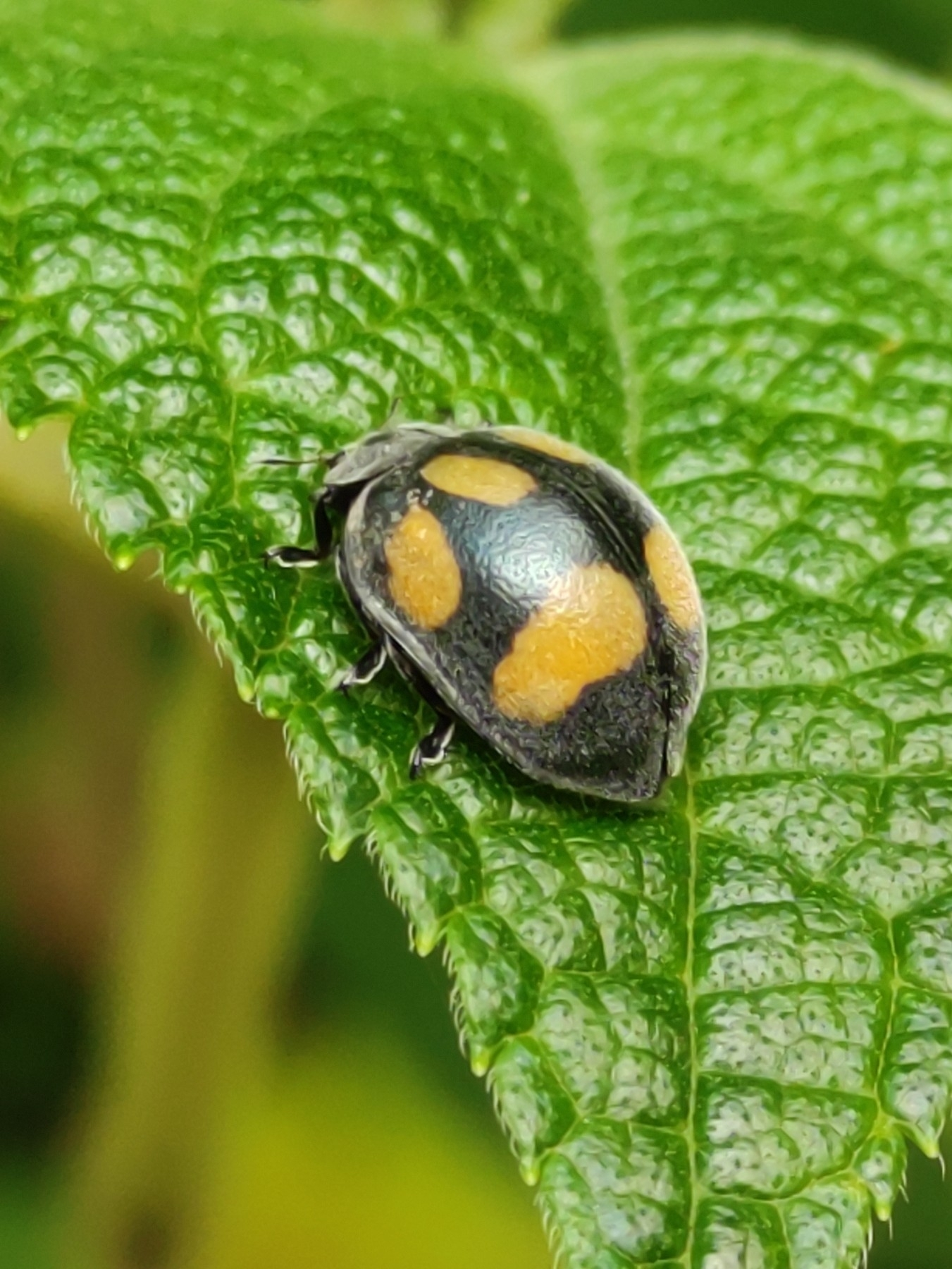
Epilachna consularis, Ecuador

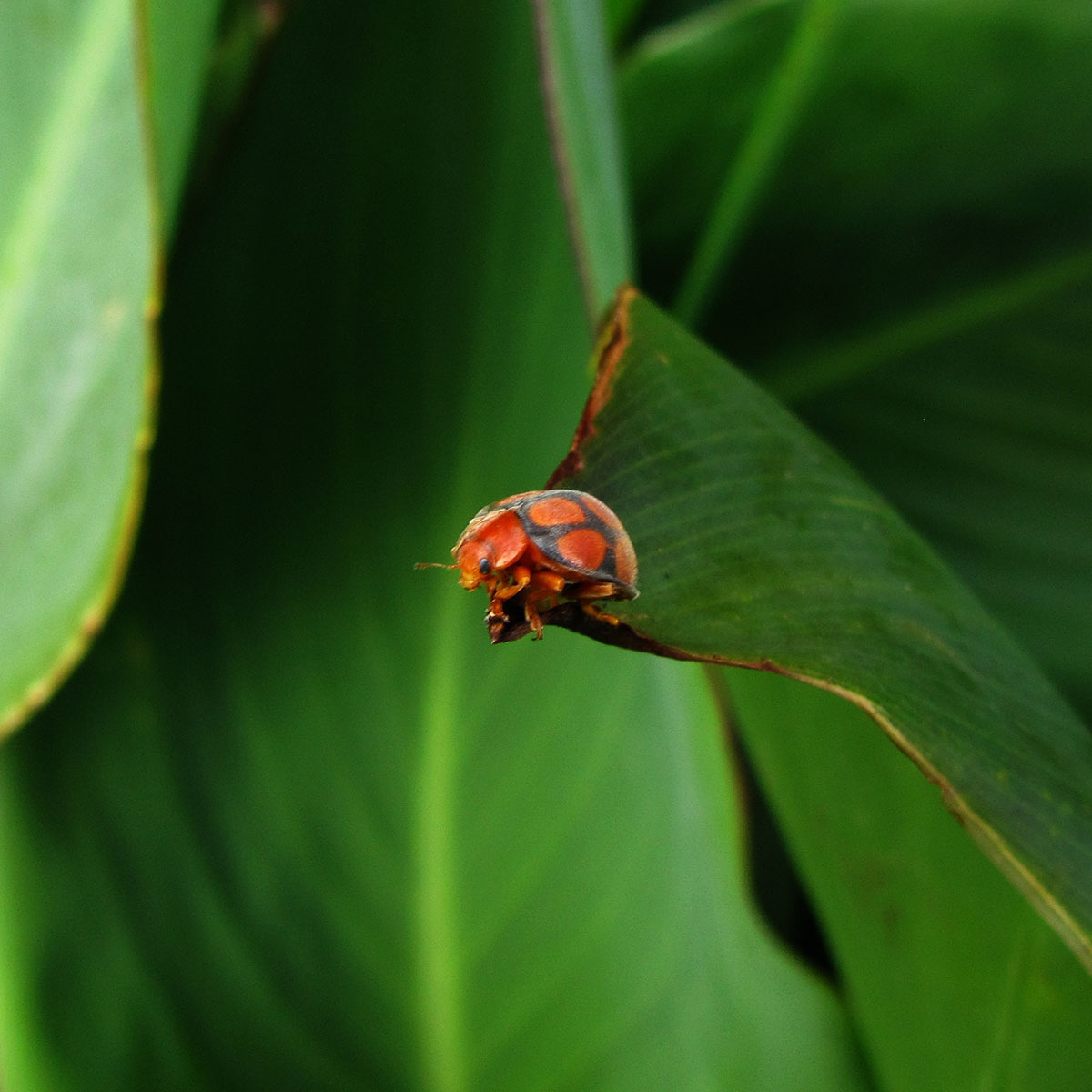
Epilachna delessertii, India

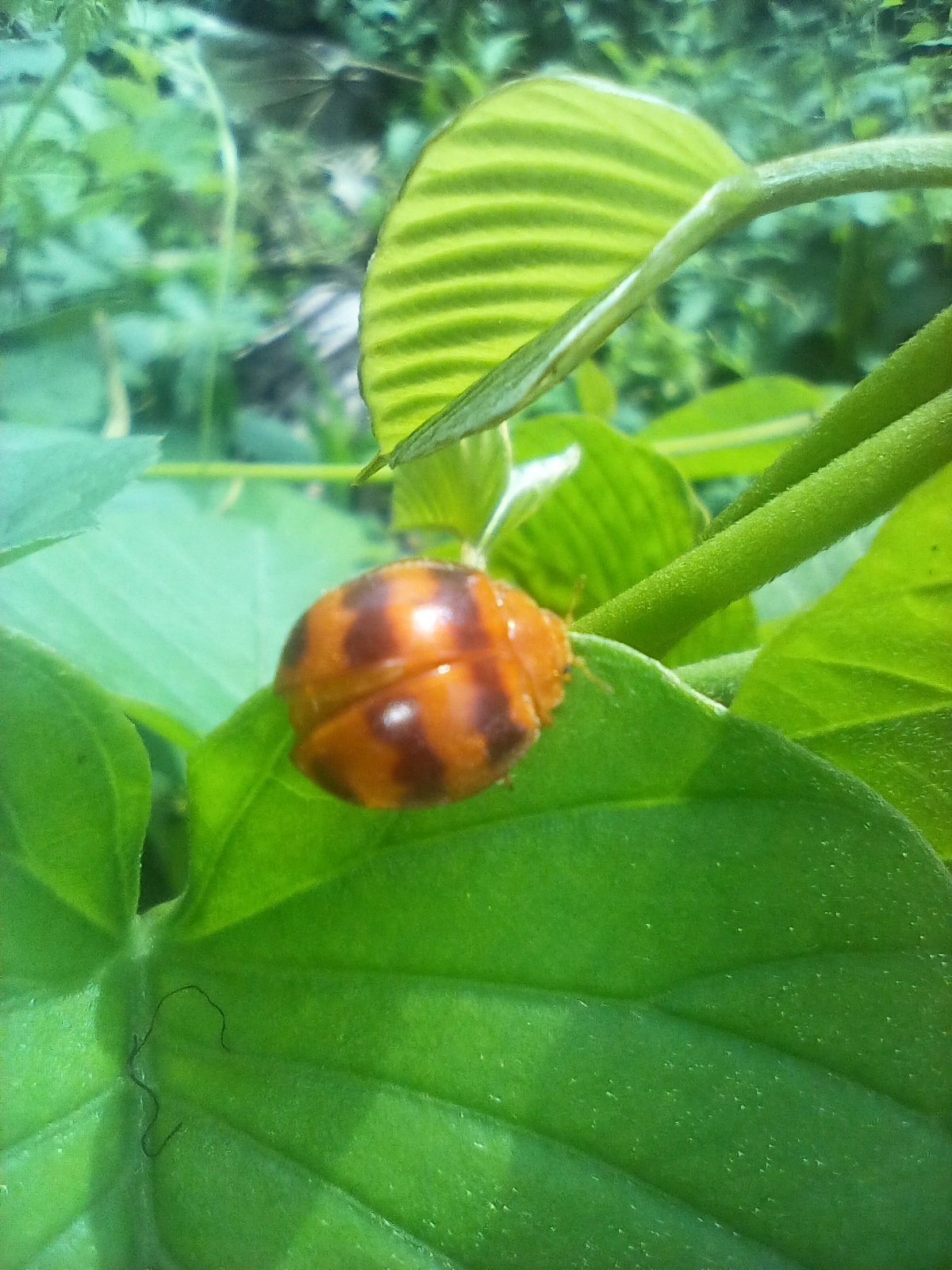
Epilachna discincta, México

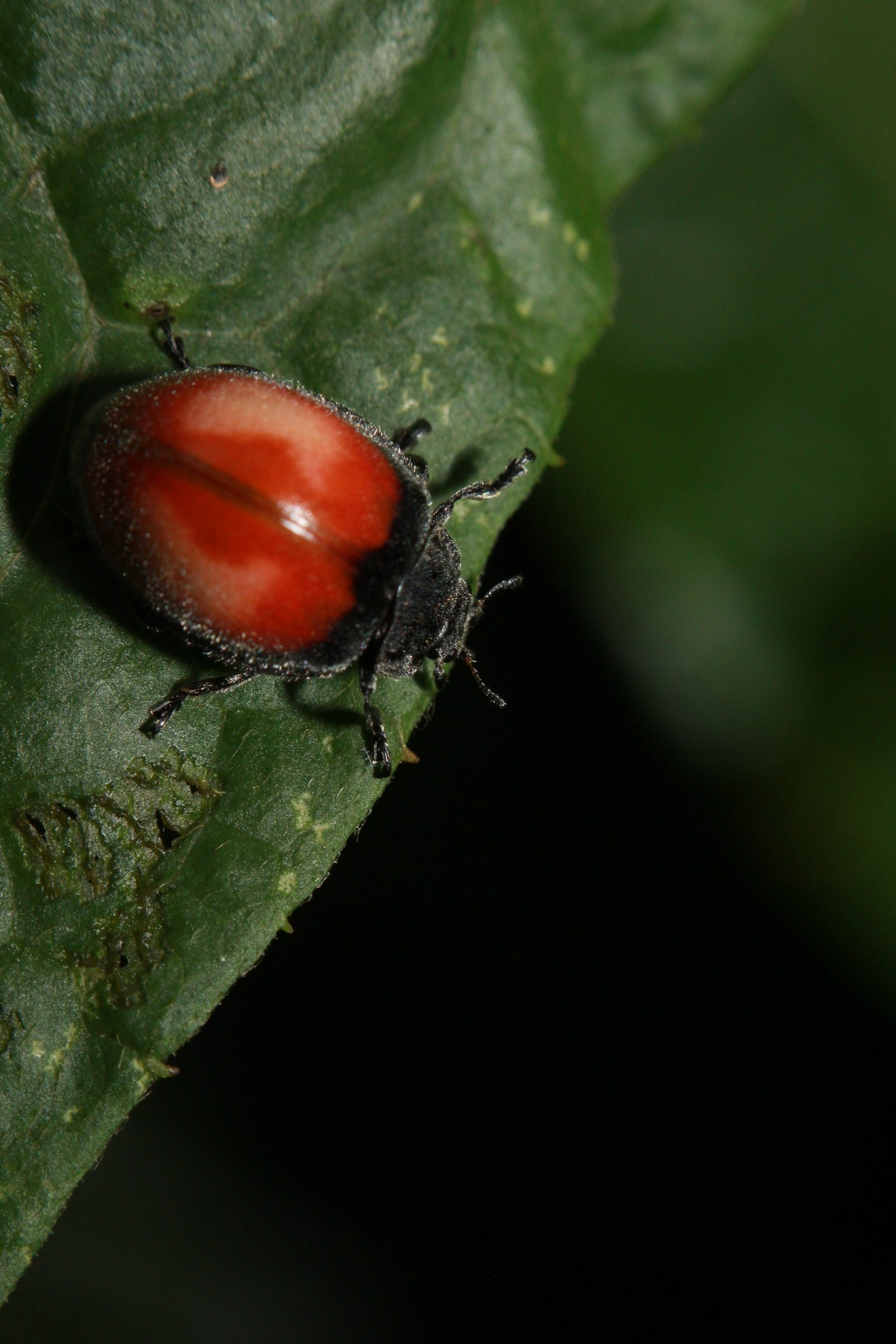
Epilachna discolor, Perú

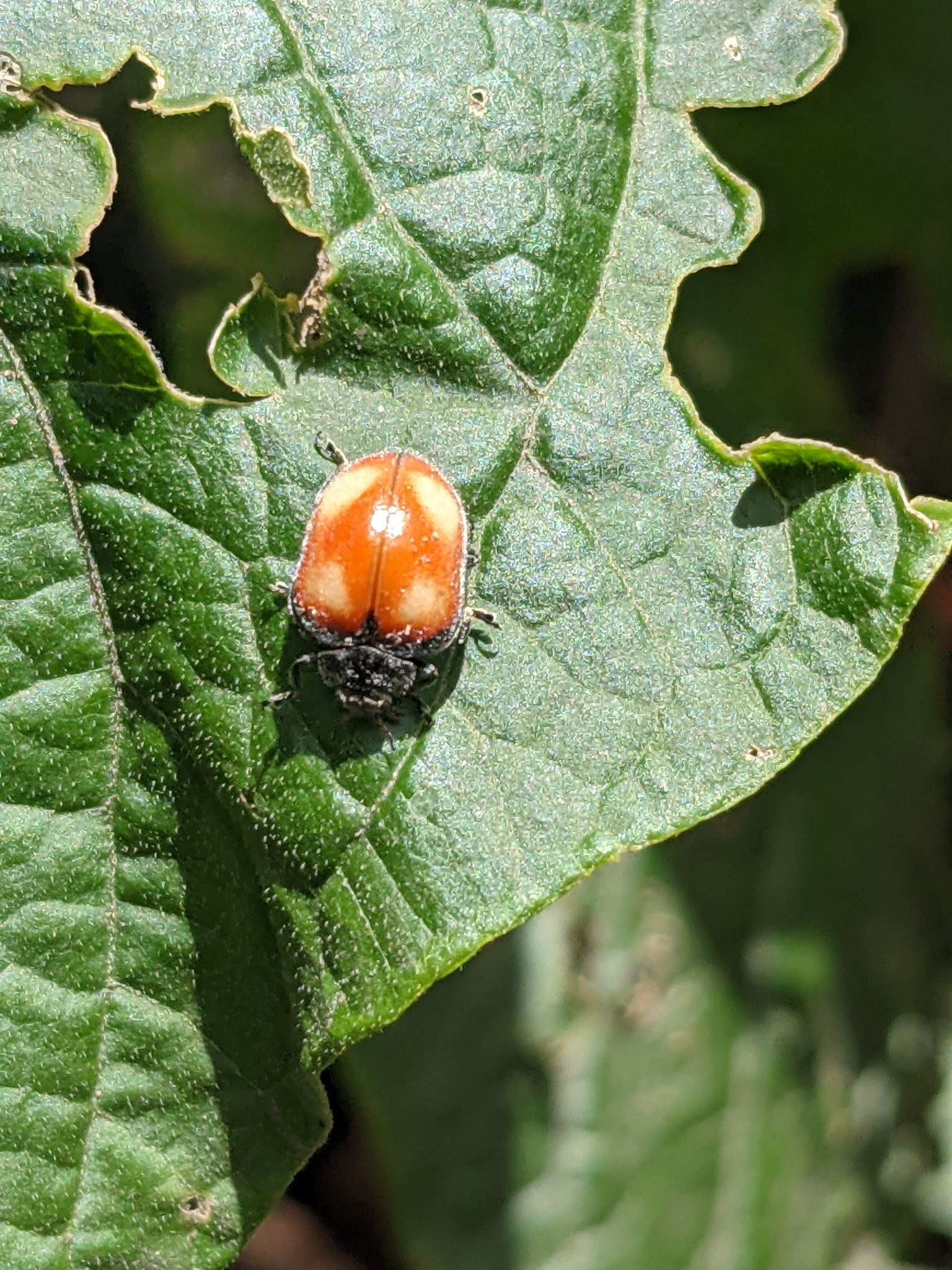
Epilachna dorsigera, Perú

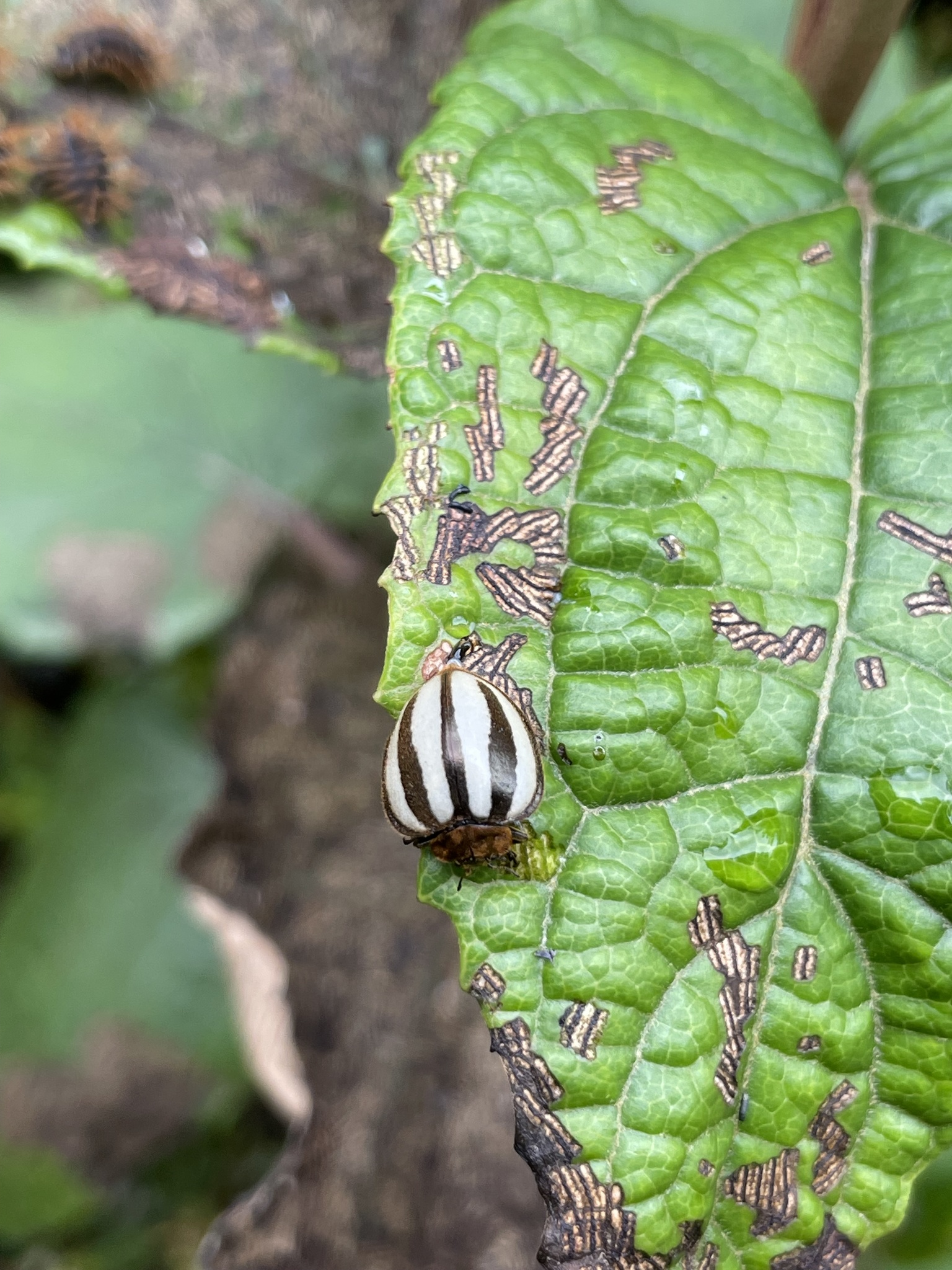
Epilachna ecuadorica, Ecuador

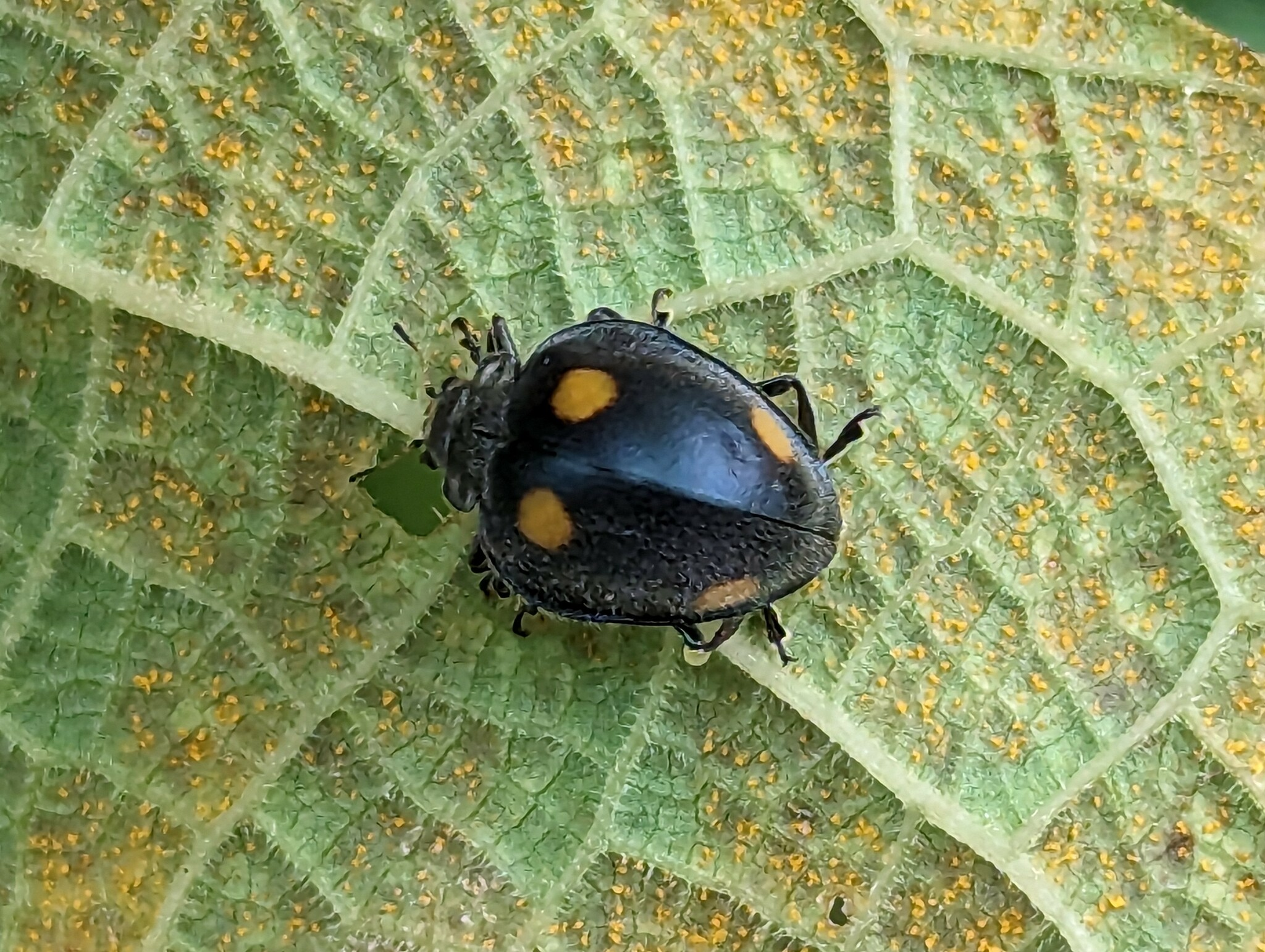
Epilachna flavocirculus, Ecuador

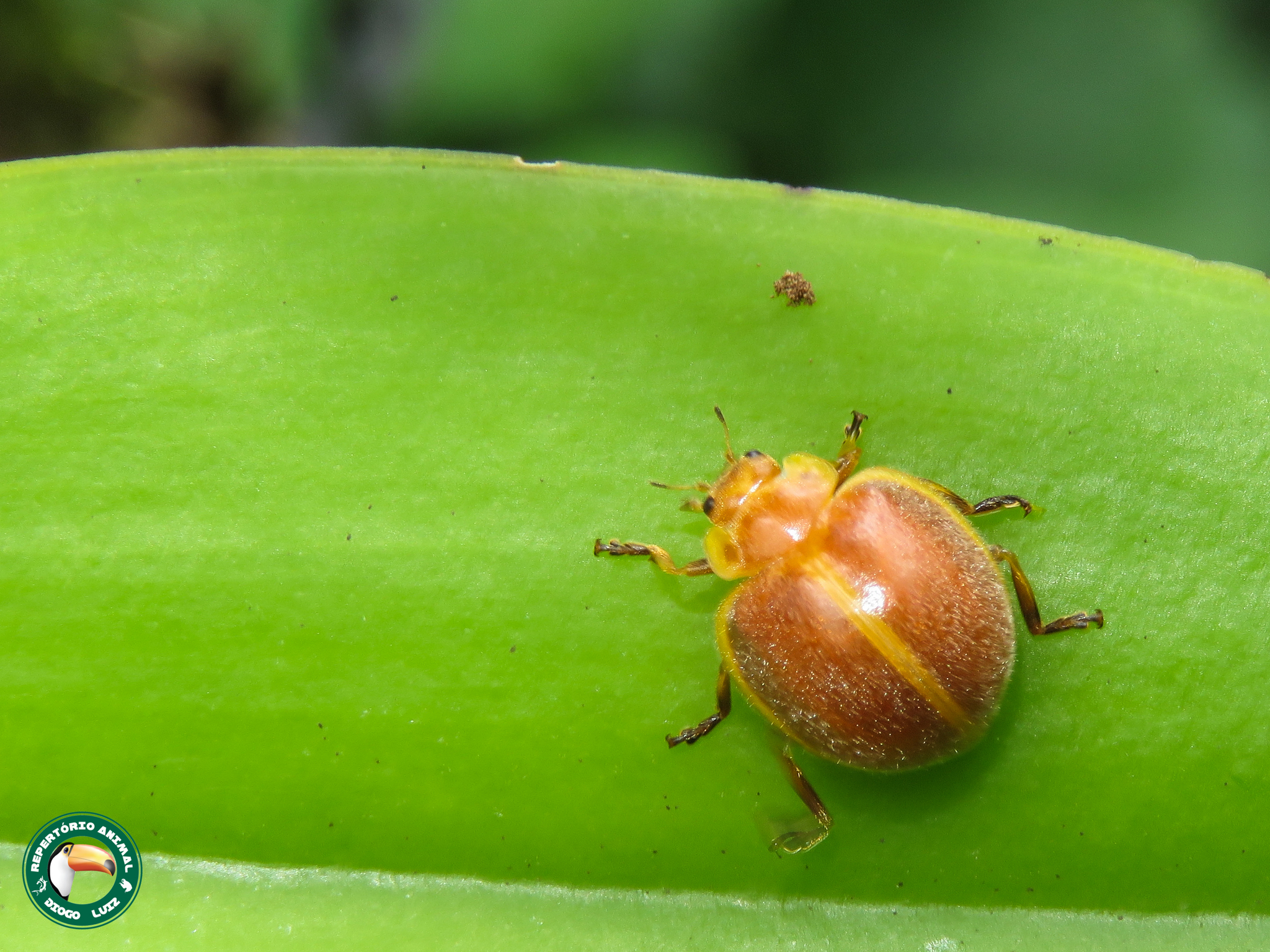
Epilachna marginella, Brasil

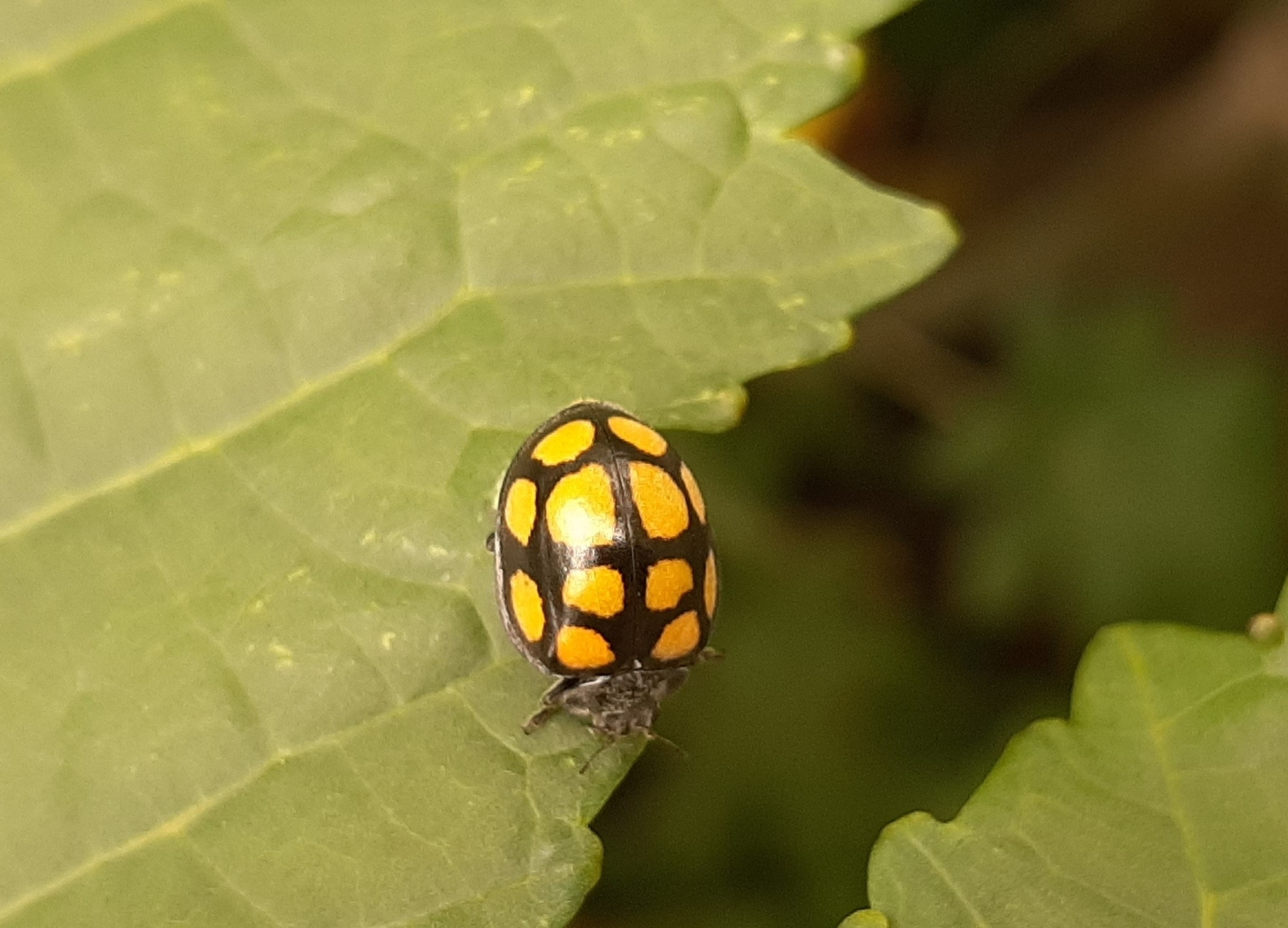
Epilachna mexicana, México

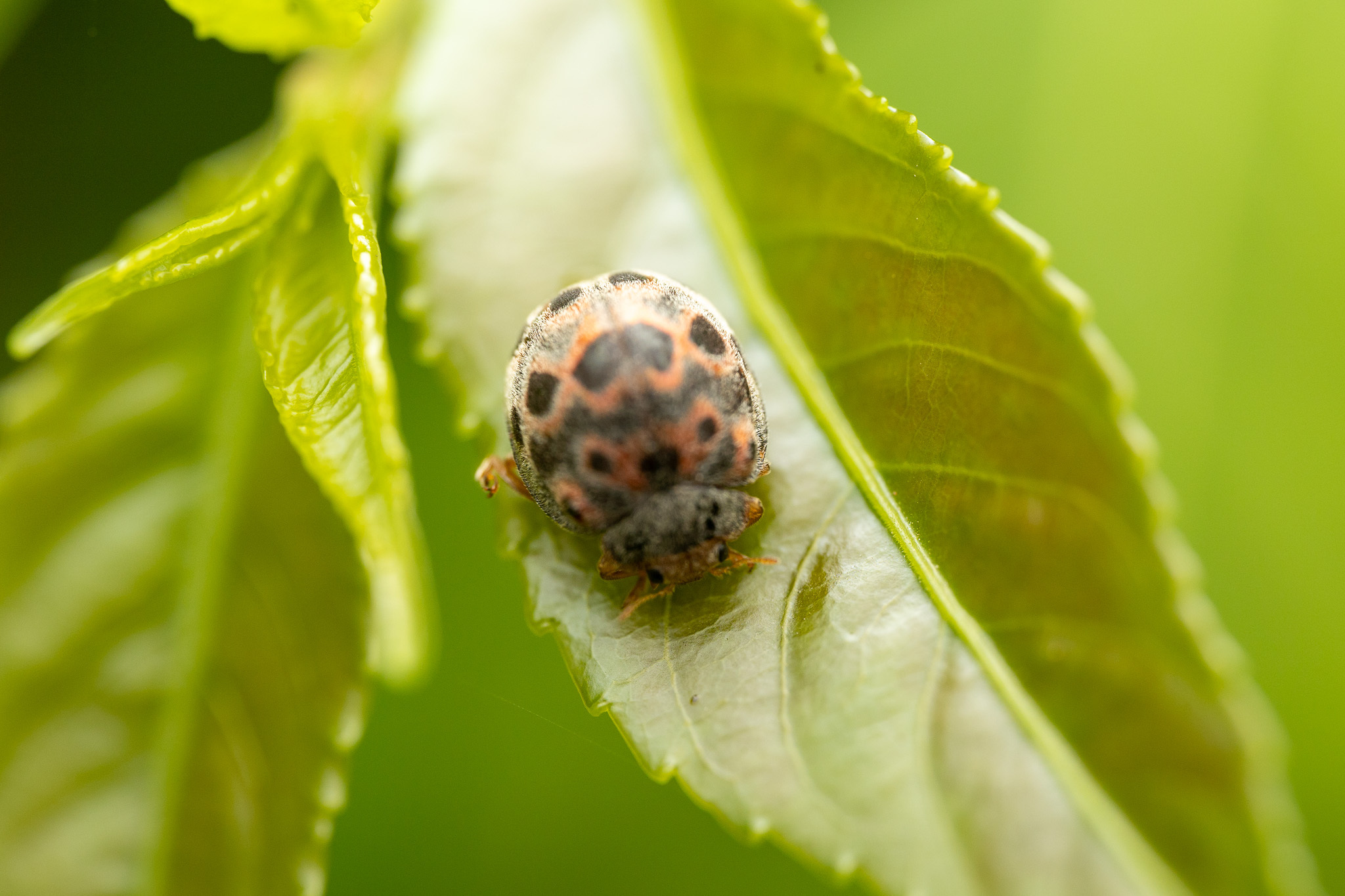
Epilachna modesta, México

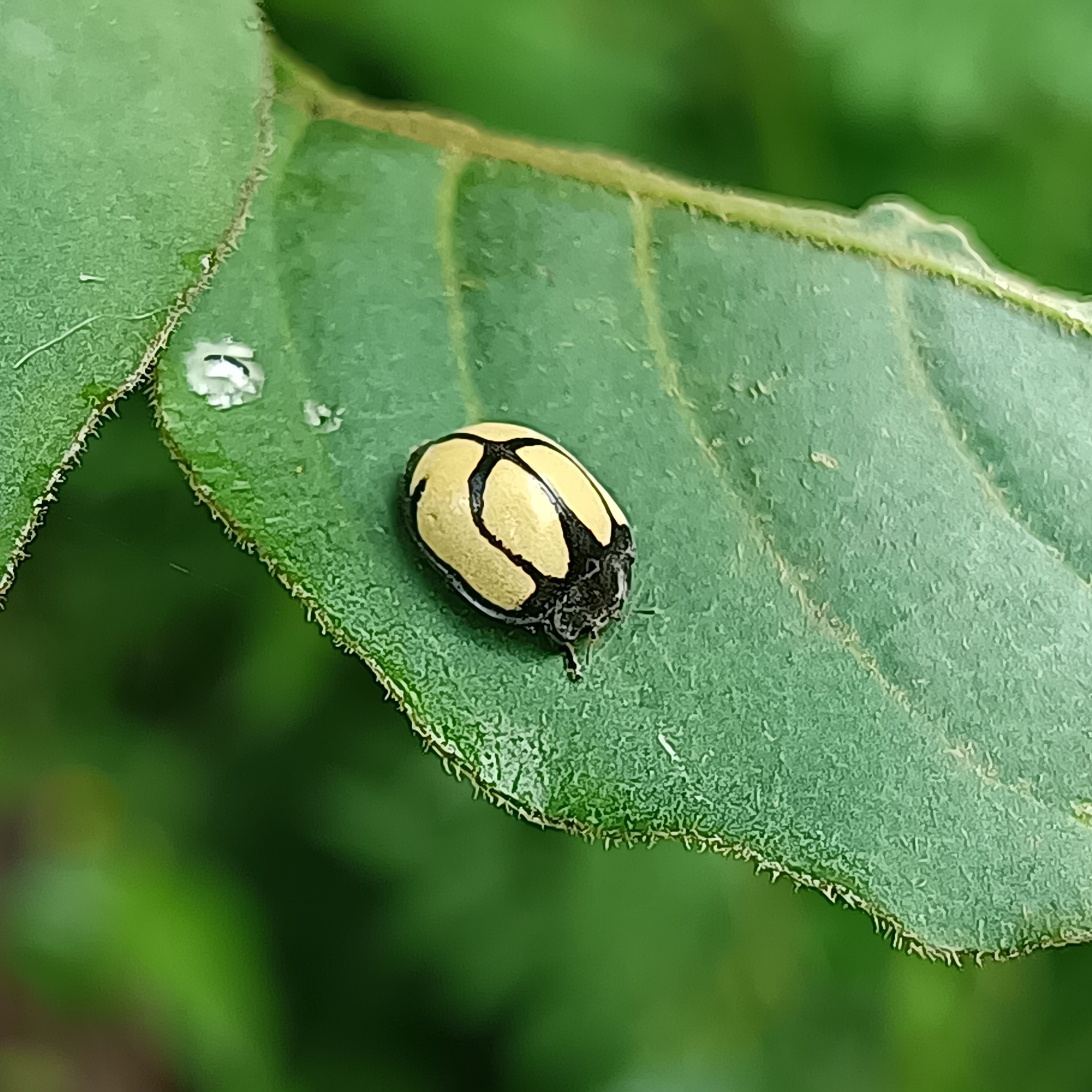
Epilachna nigrocincta, México

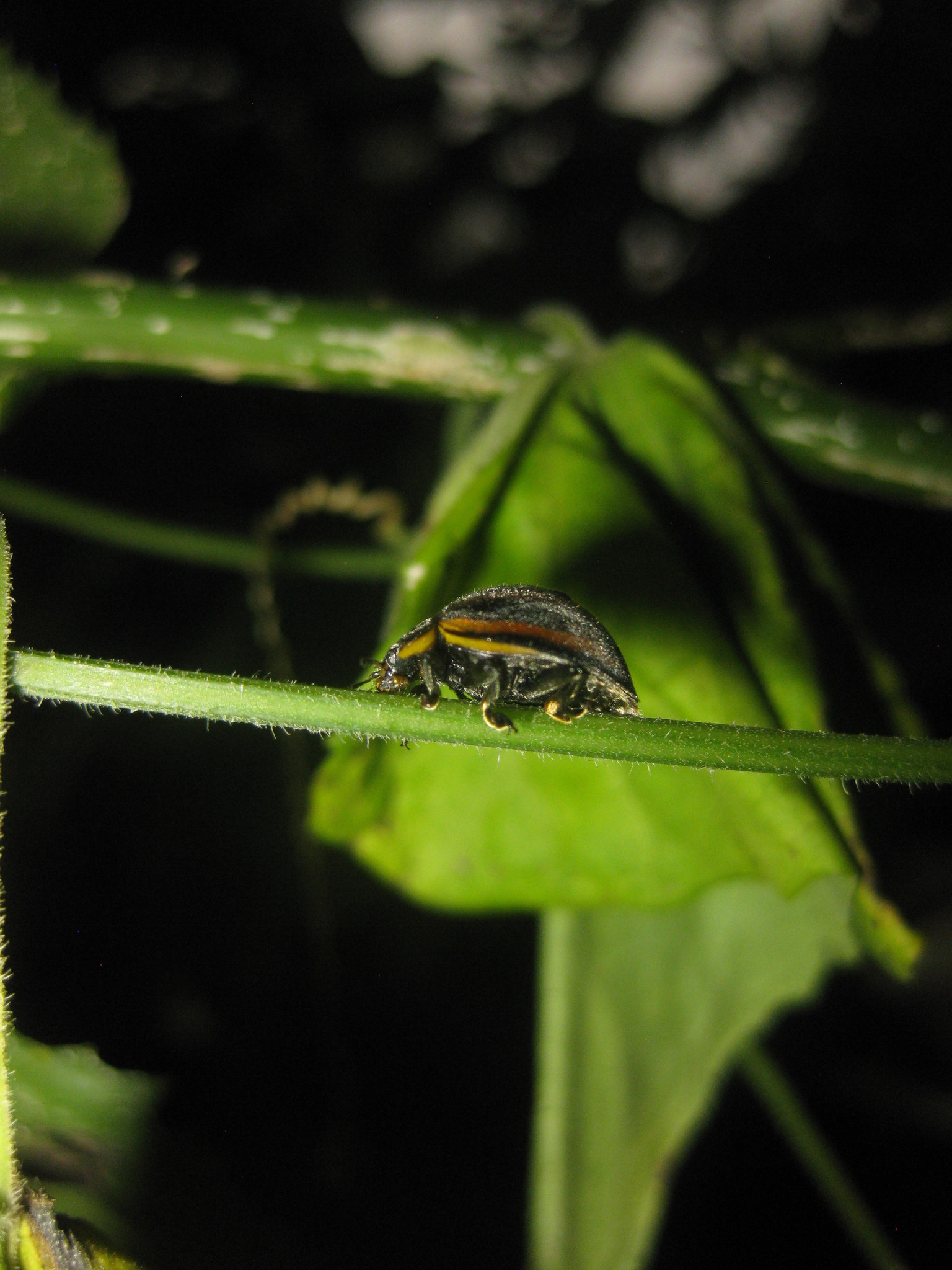
Epilachna nigrovittata, Ecuador

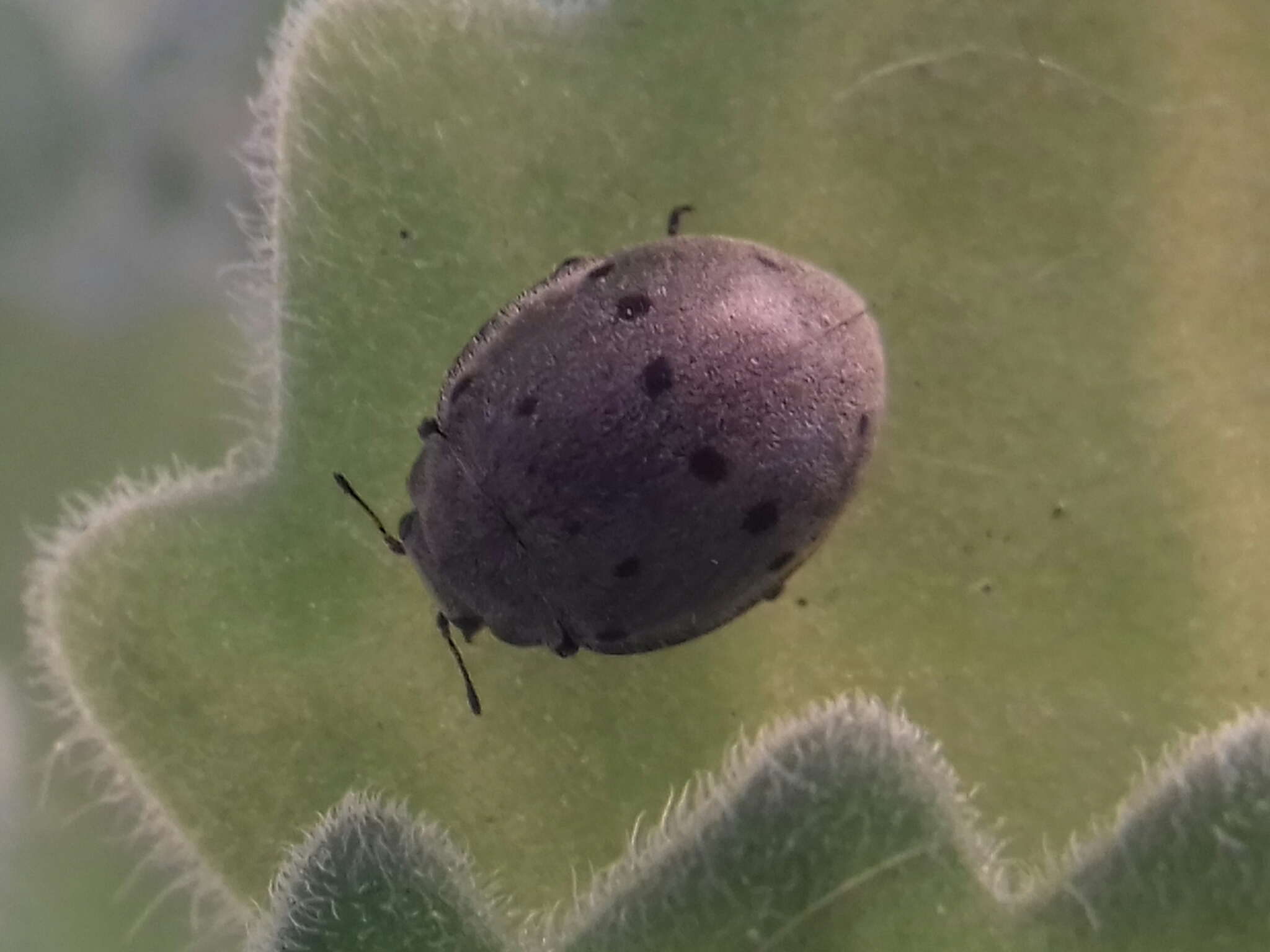
Epilachna obscurella, México

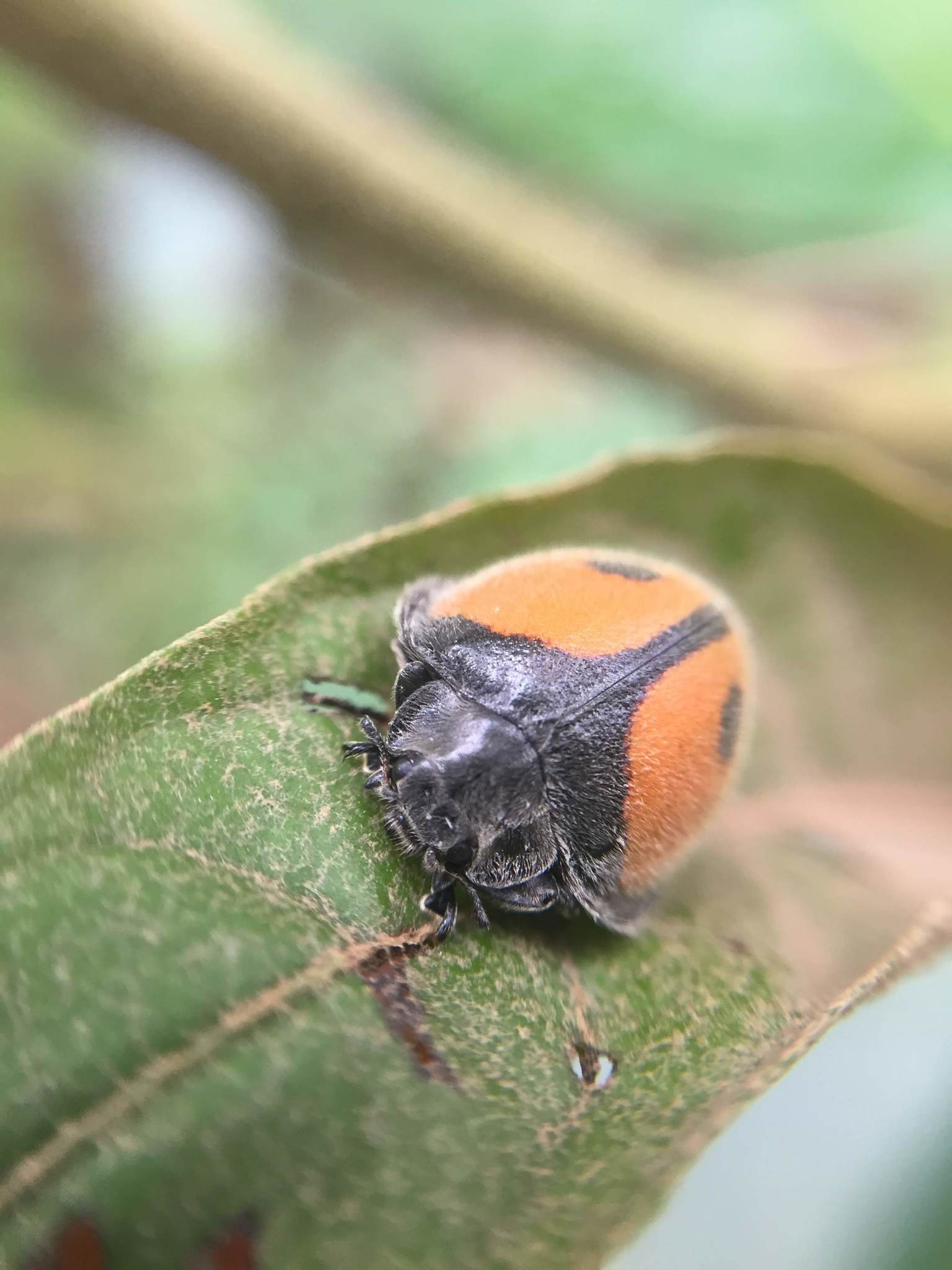
Epilachna ovaloides, Colombia

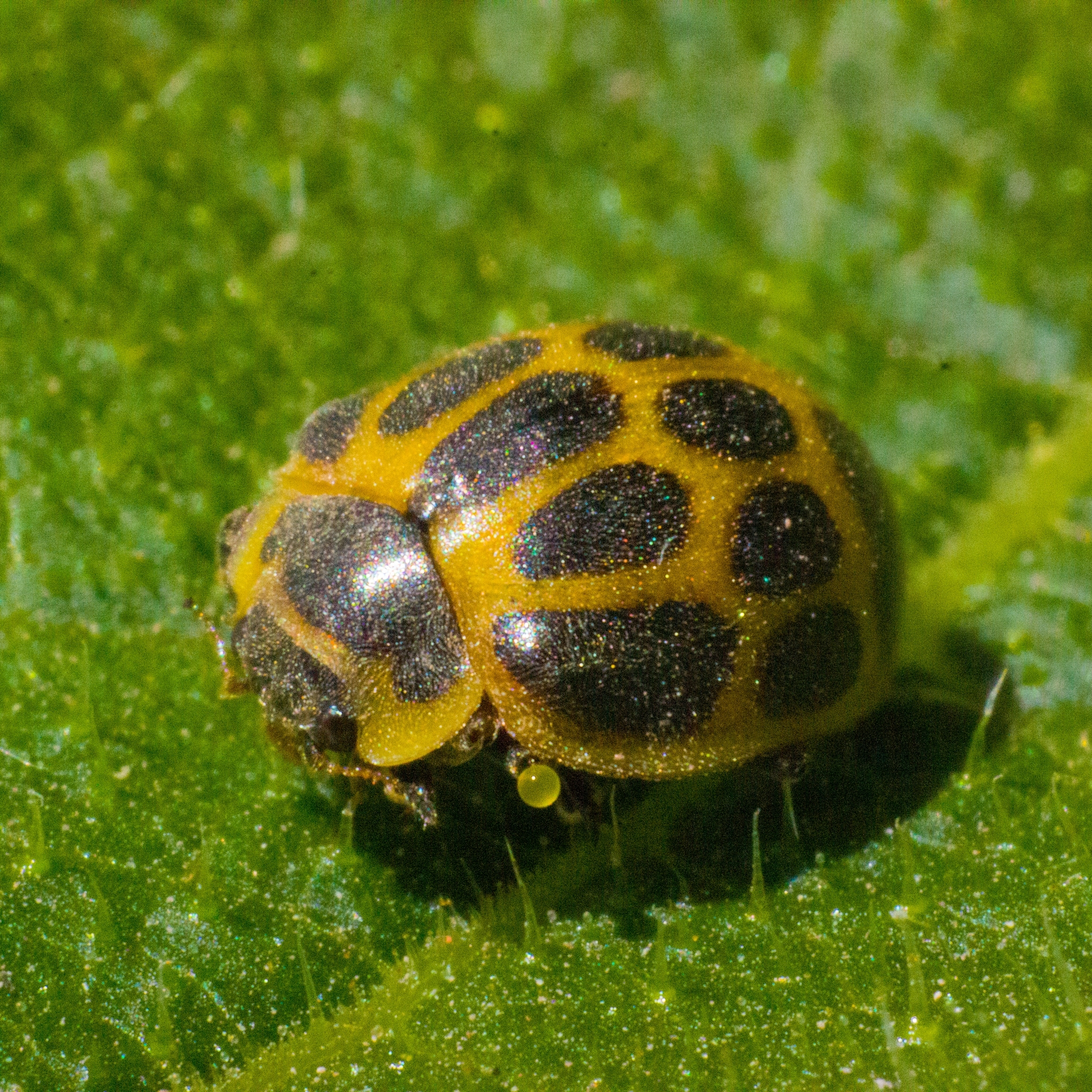
Epilachna paenulata, Argentina

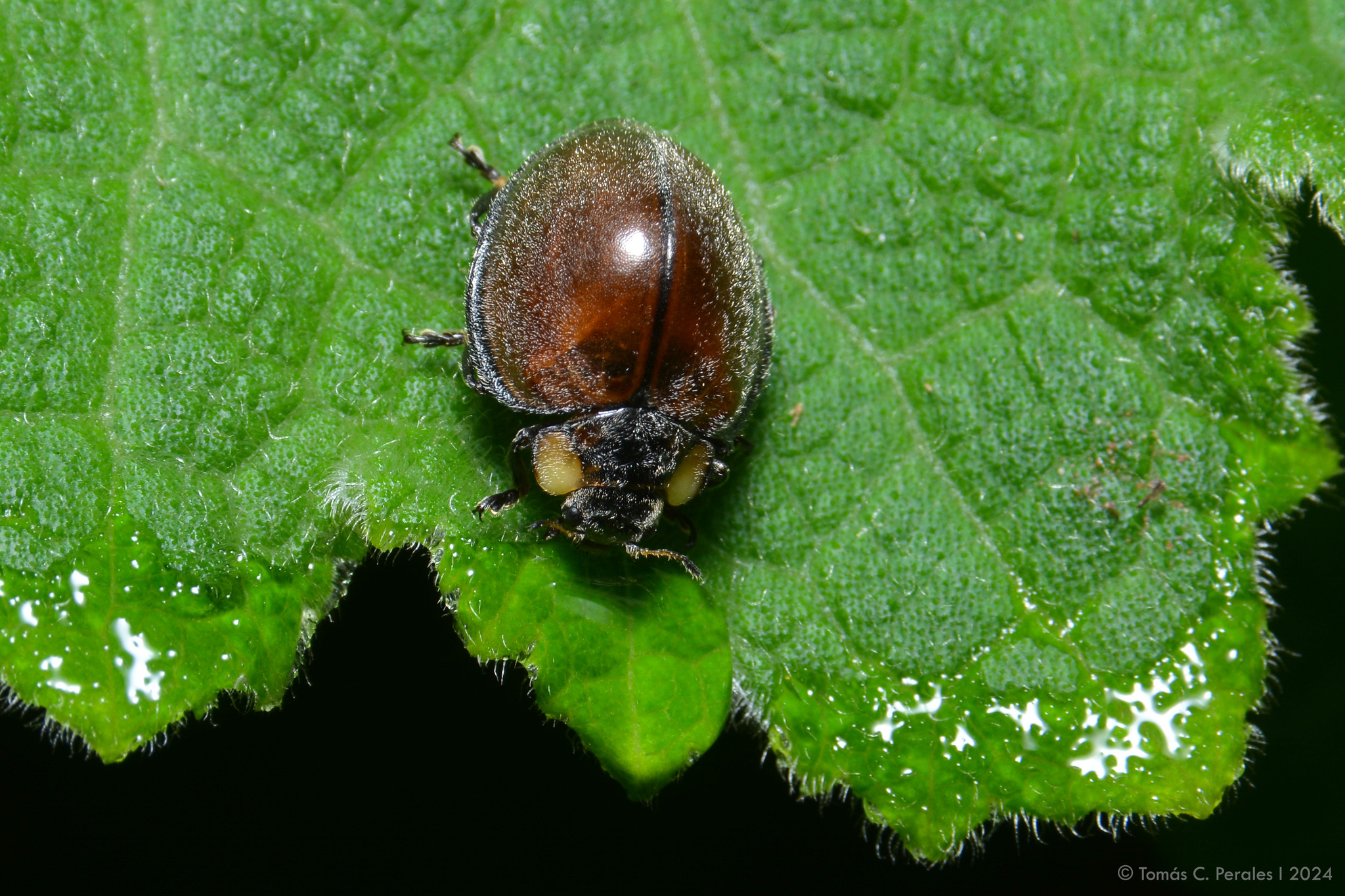
Epilachna pastica, Argentina

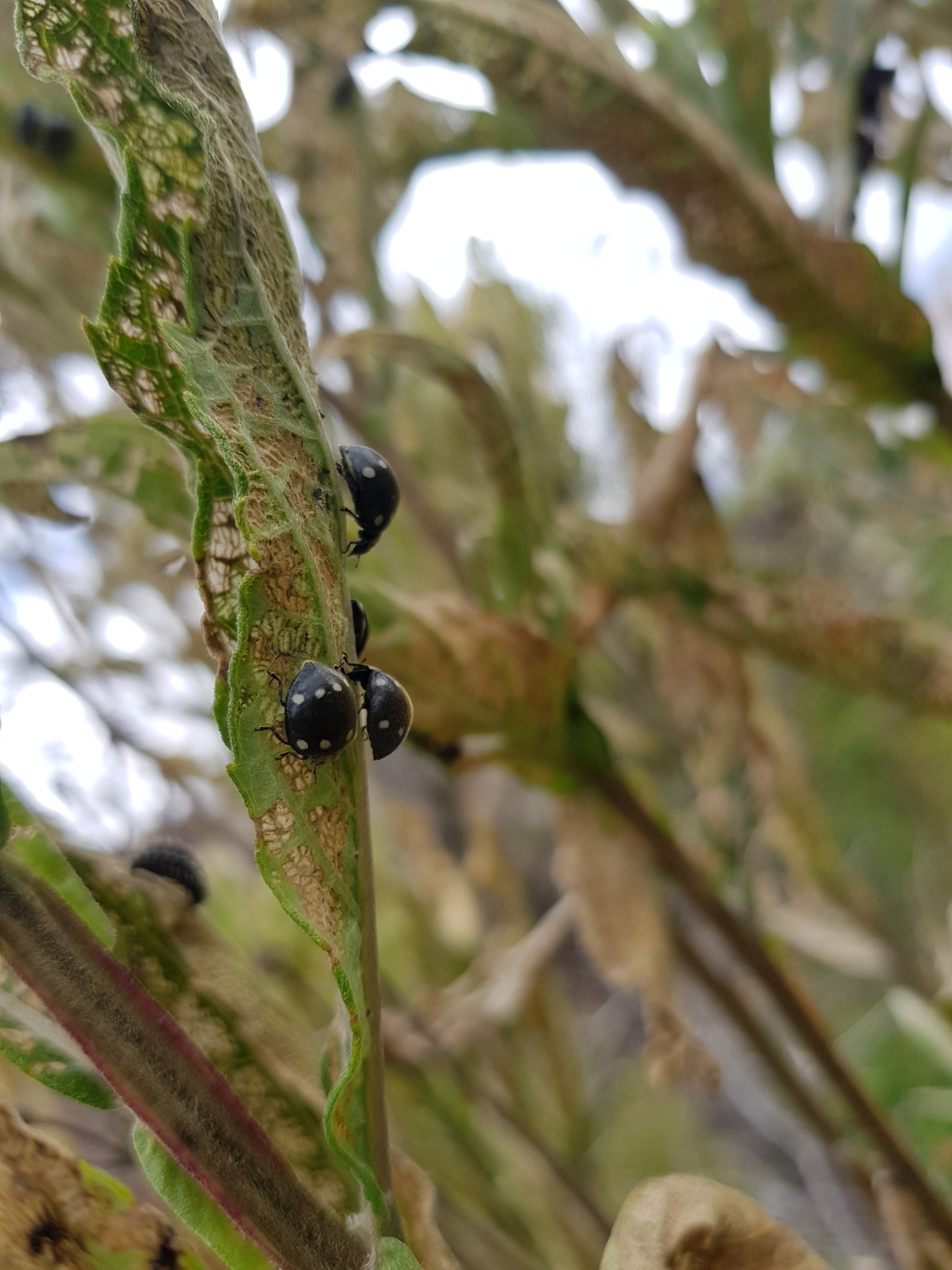
Epilachna patricia, Bolivia

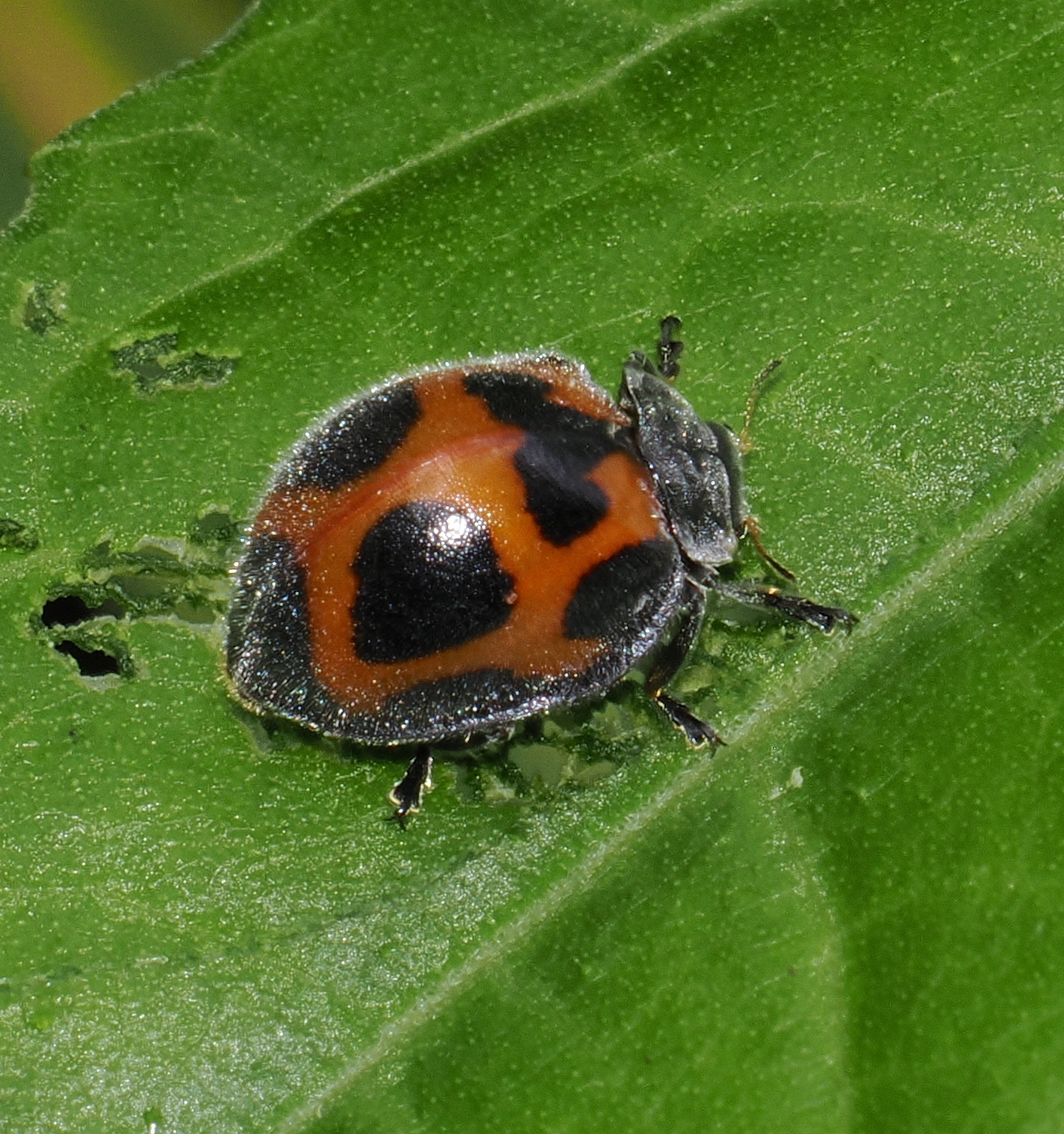
Epilachna pictipennis, Colombia

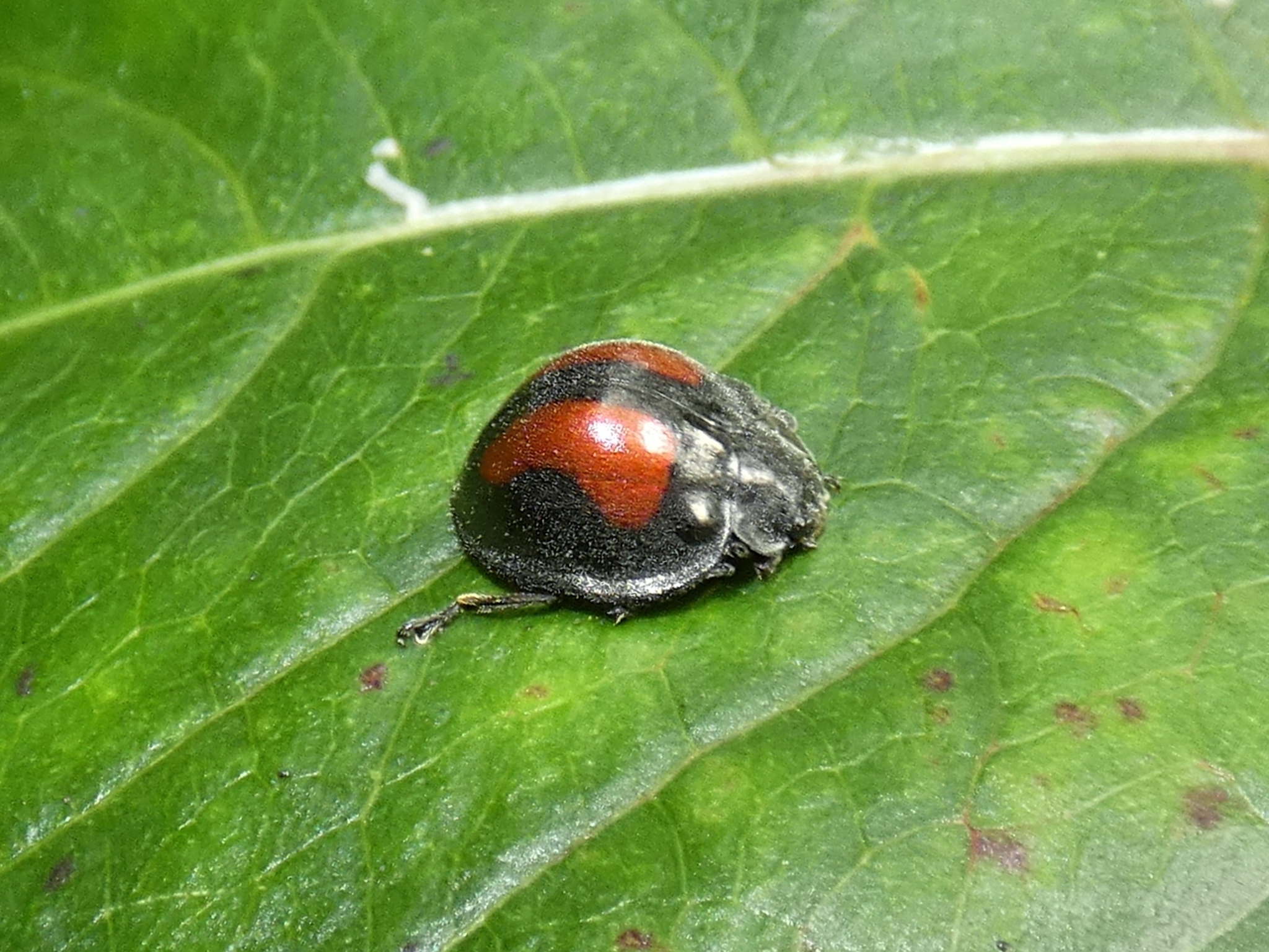
Epilachna plagiata, Panamá

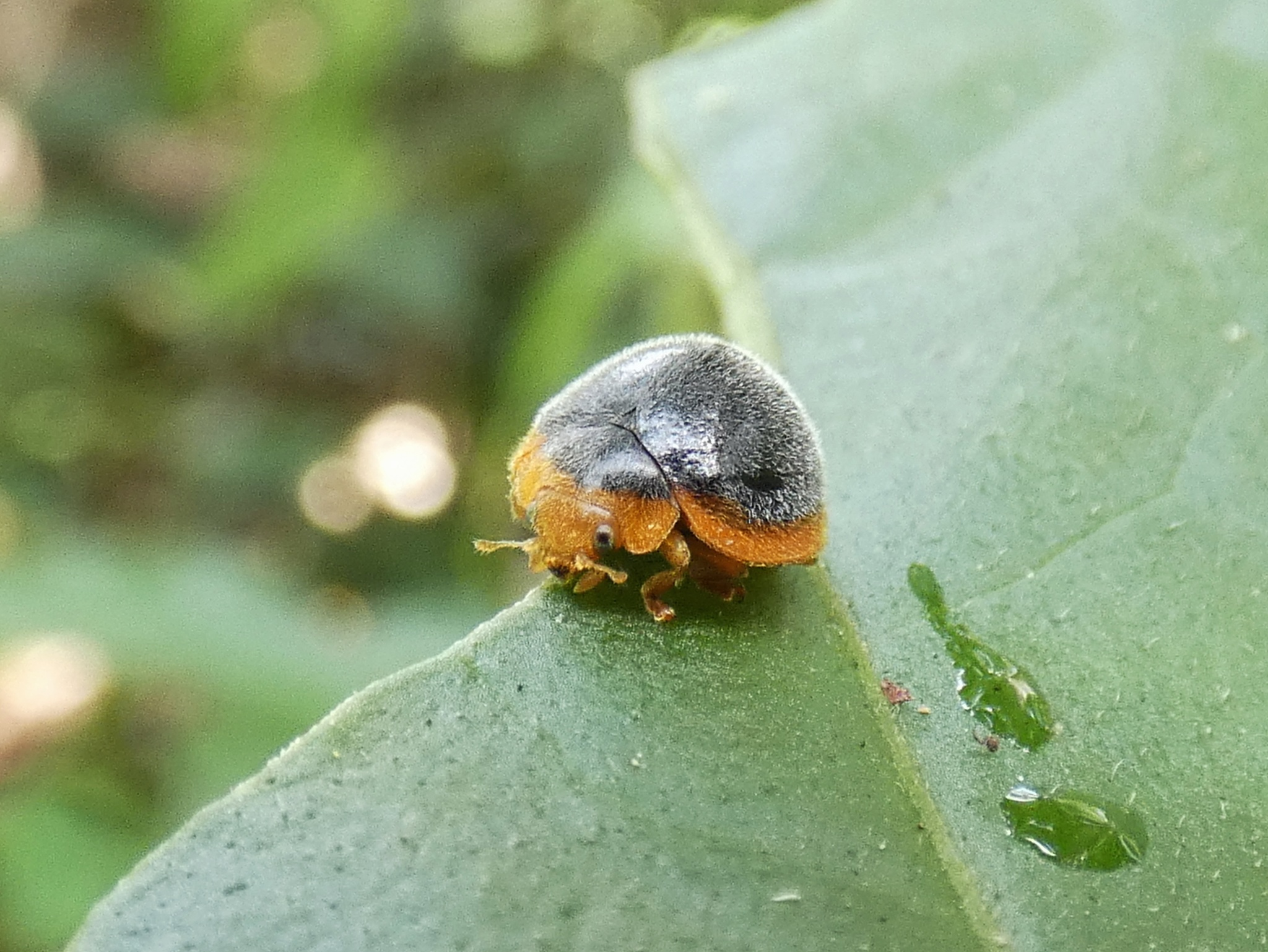
Epilachna pseudorealis, Panamá

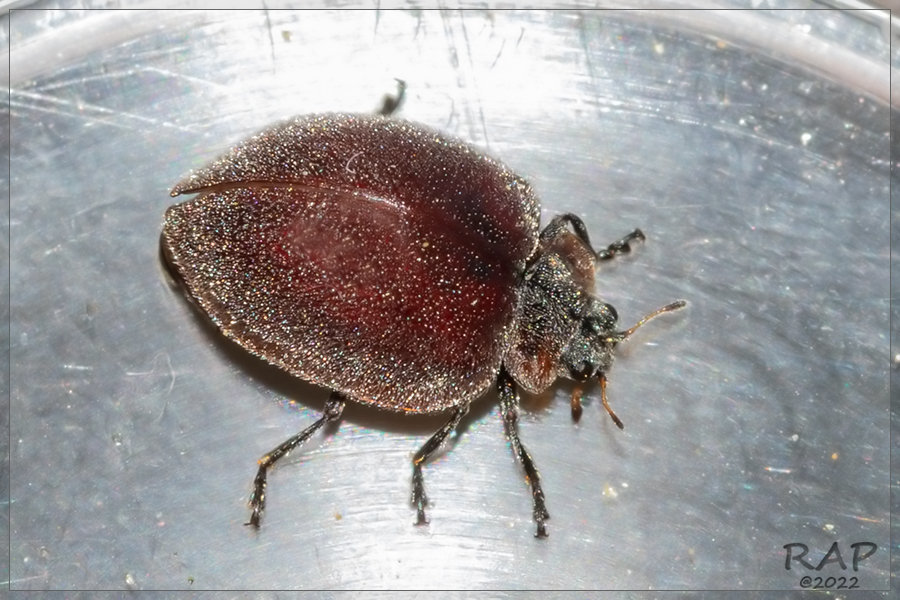
Epilachna punctatissima, Argentina

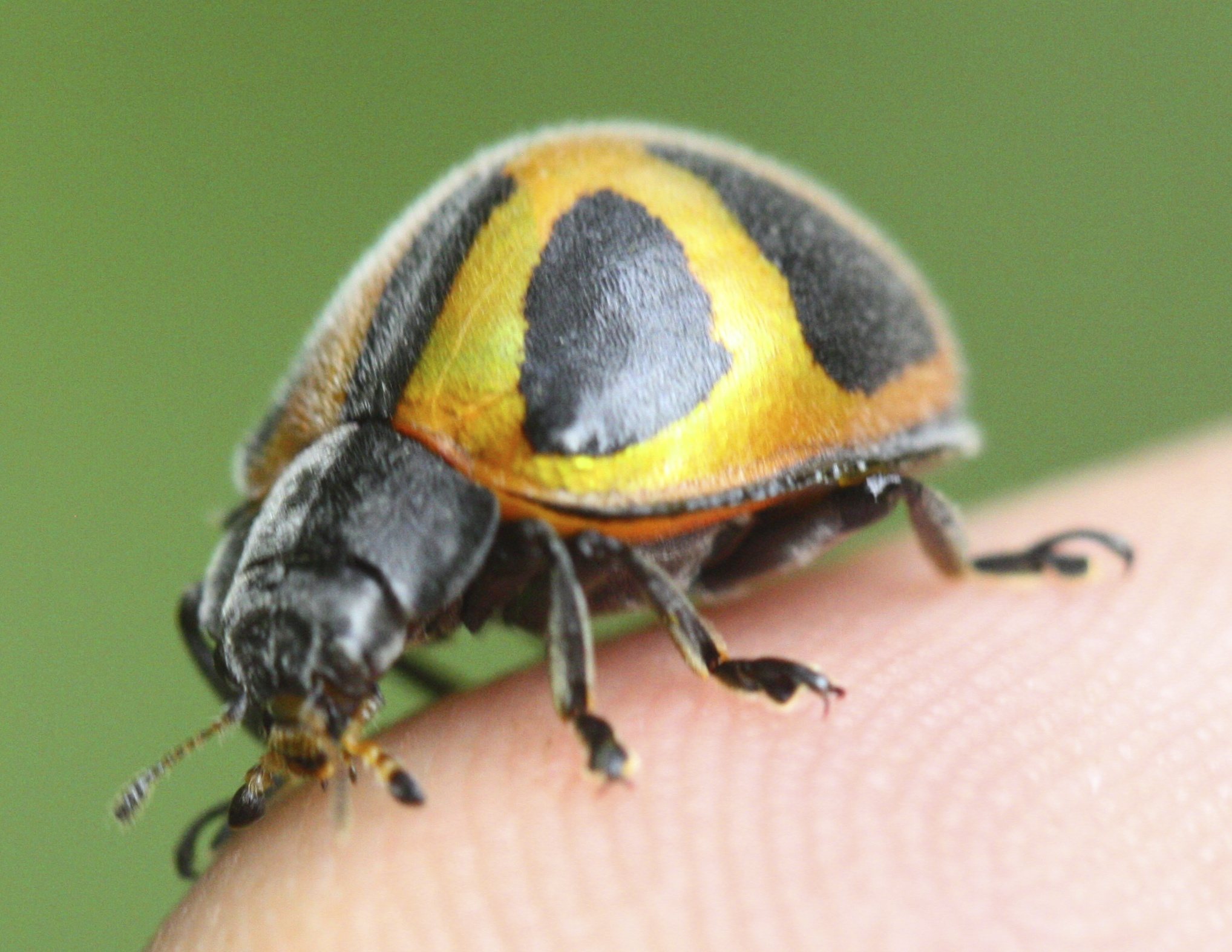
Epilachna radiata, Colombia

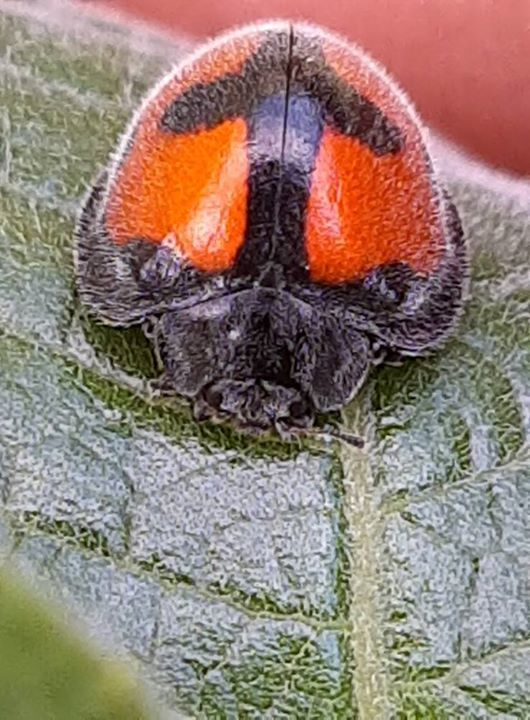
Epilachna rauli, Colombia

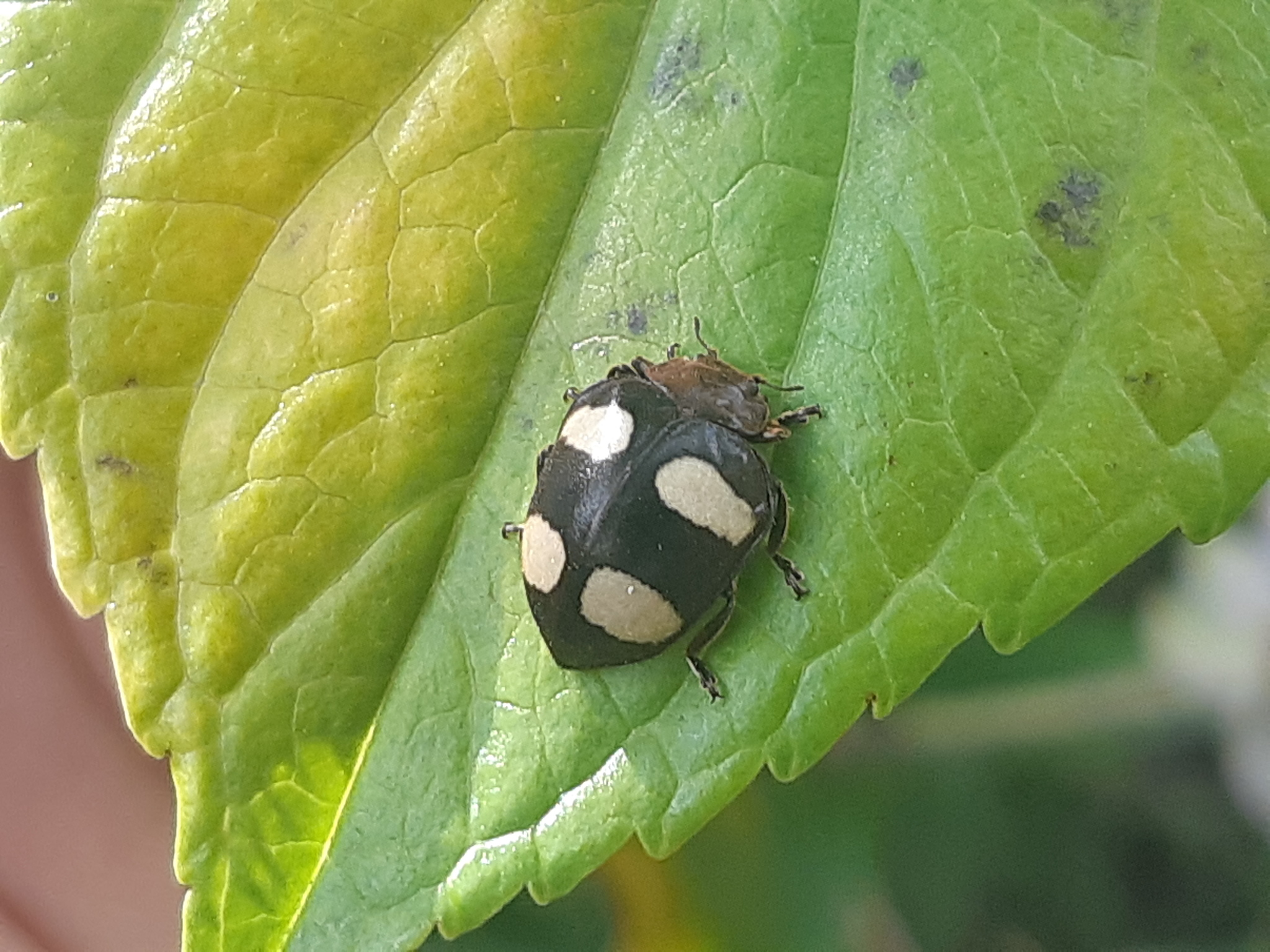
Epilachna riveti, Ecuador

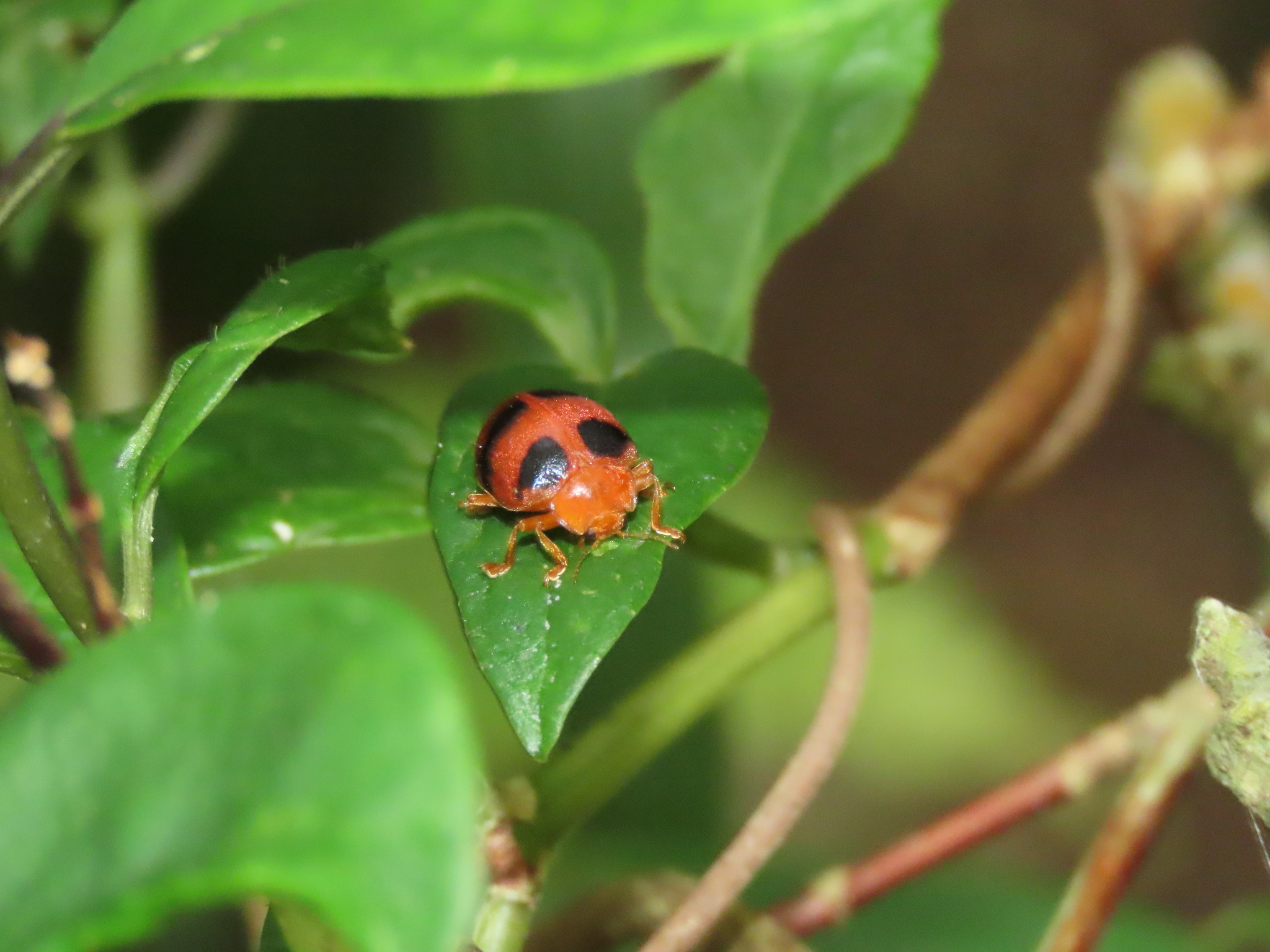
Epilachna sauteri, Taiwan

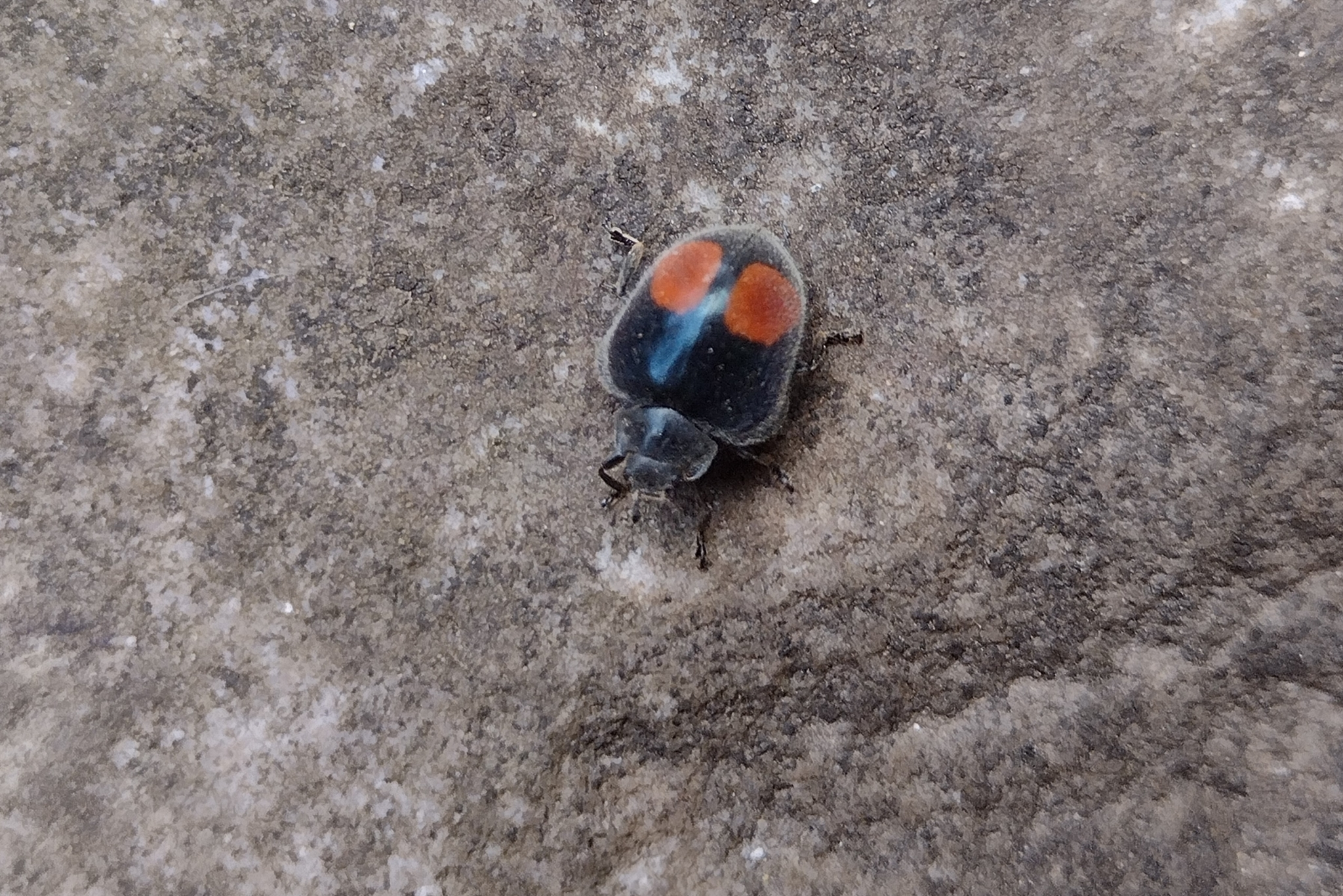
Epilachna sellata, Argentina

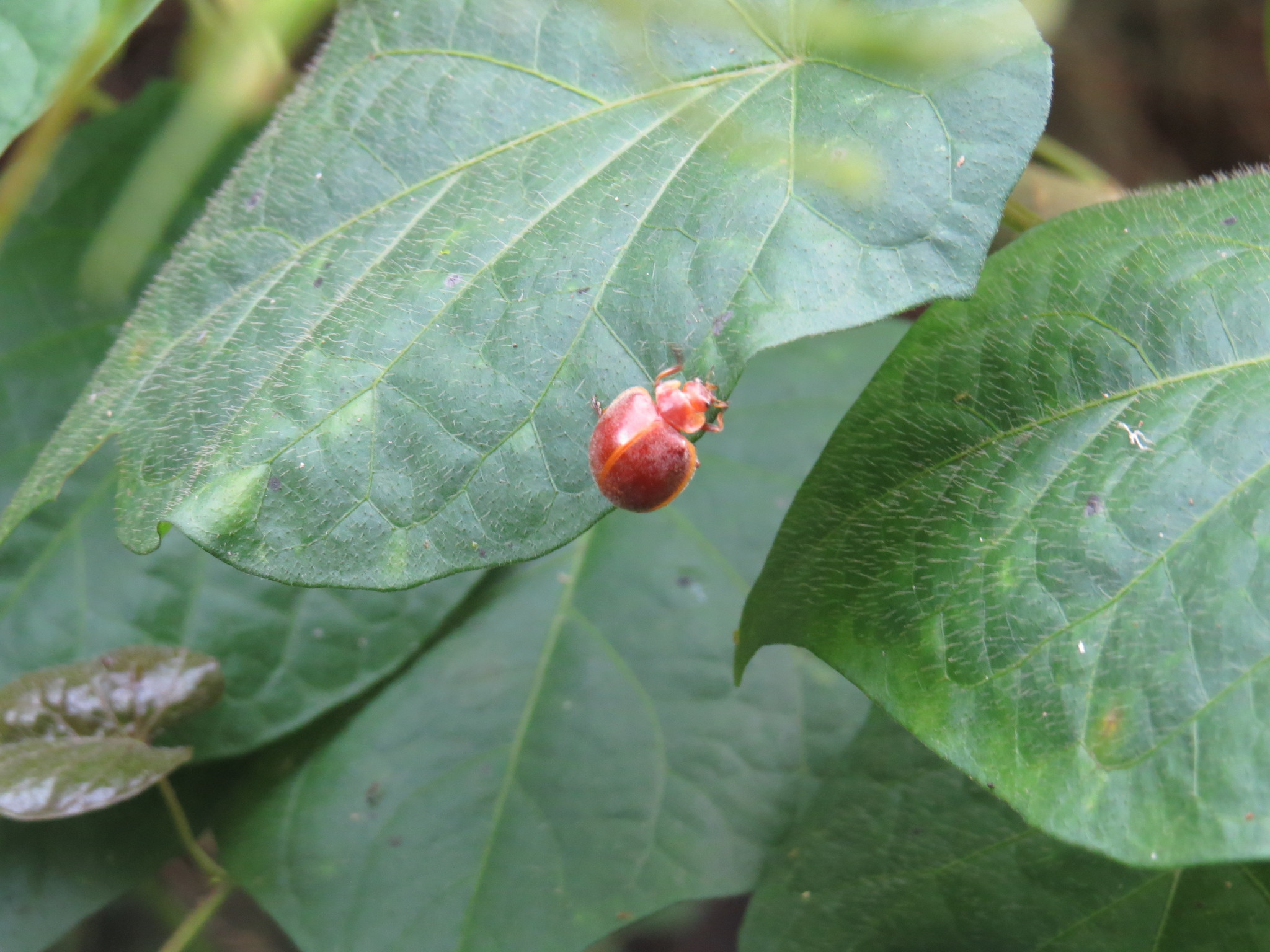
Epilachna spreta, Brasil

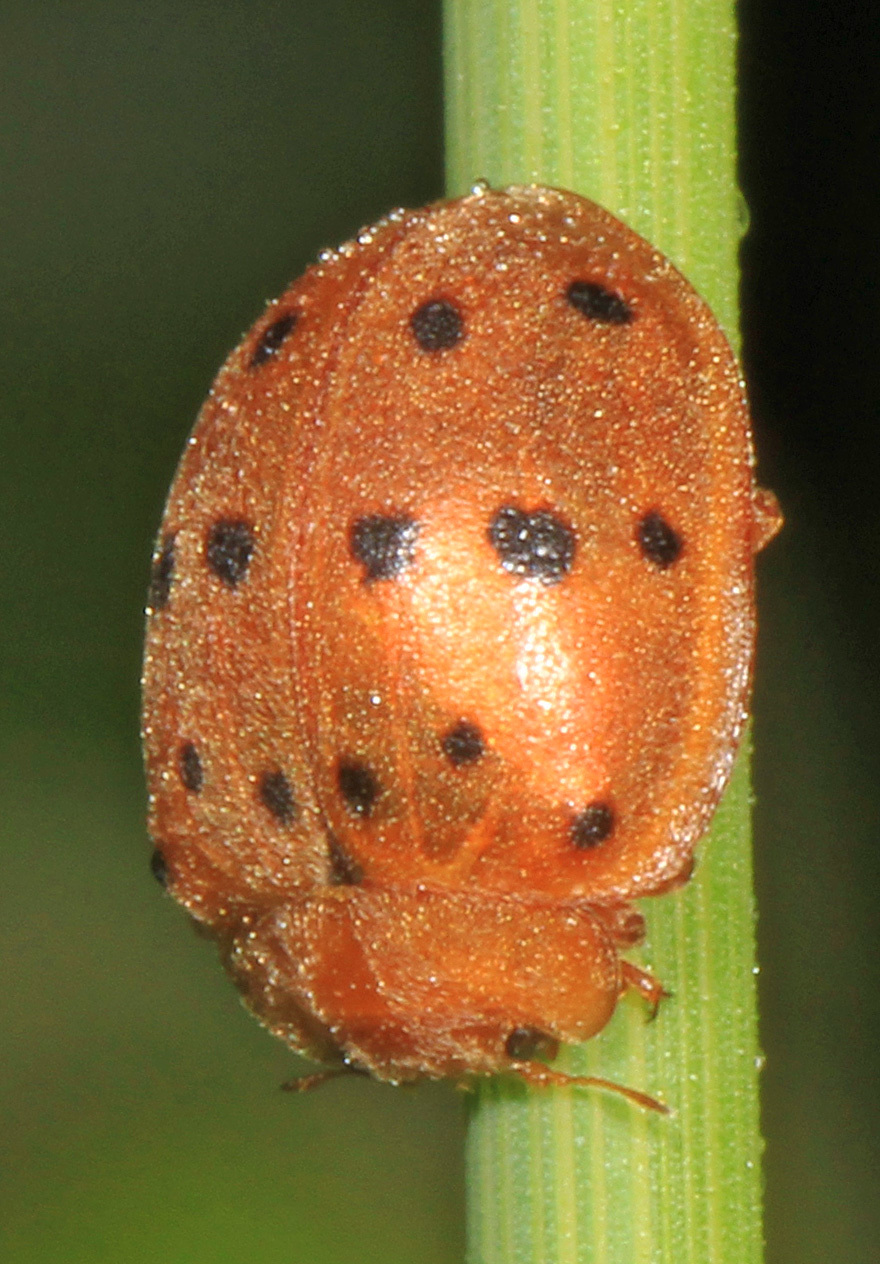
Epilachna varivestis, Maryland

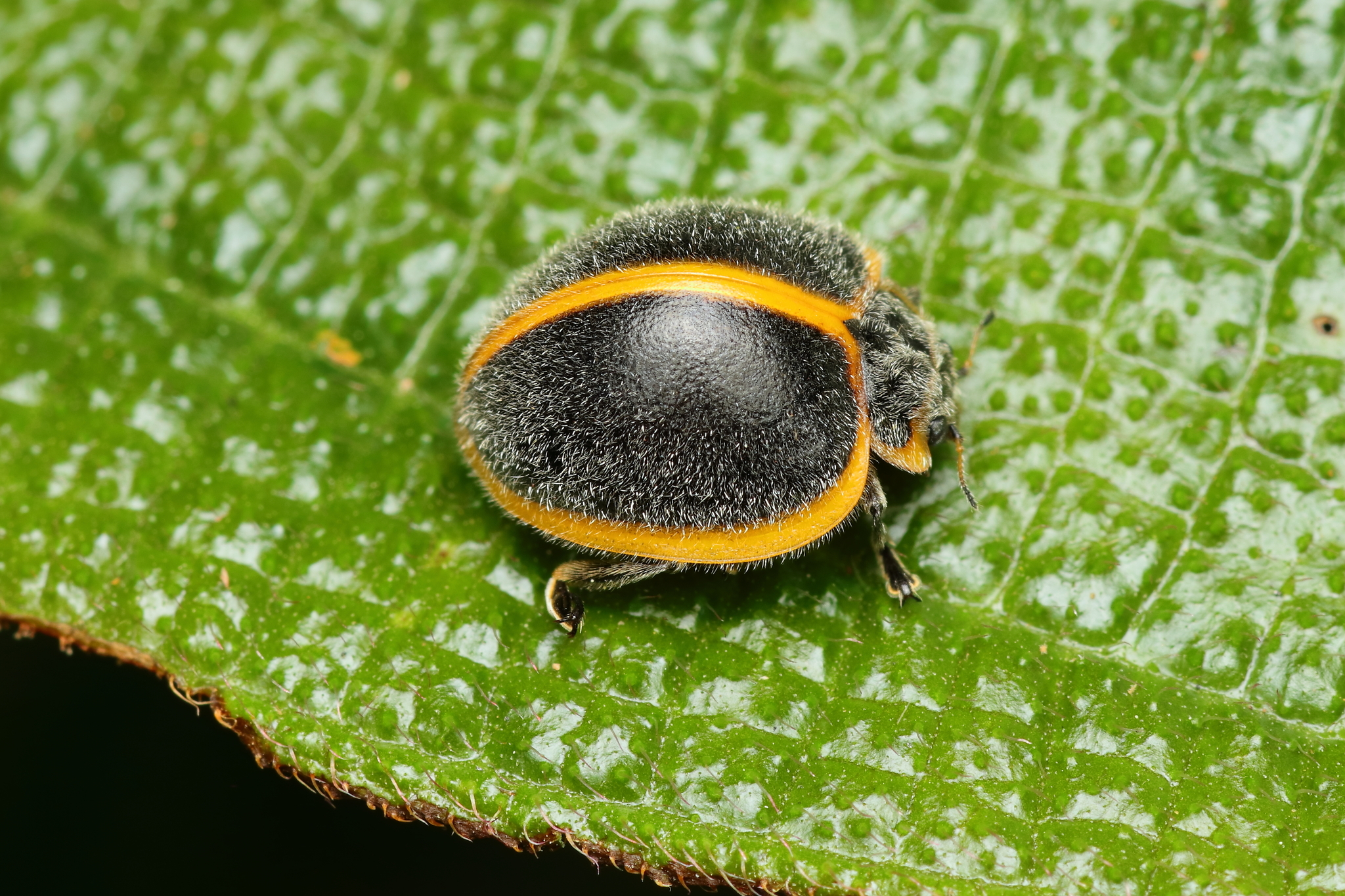
Epilachna velutina, Brasil

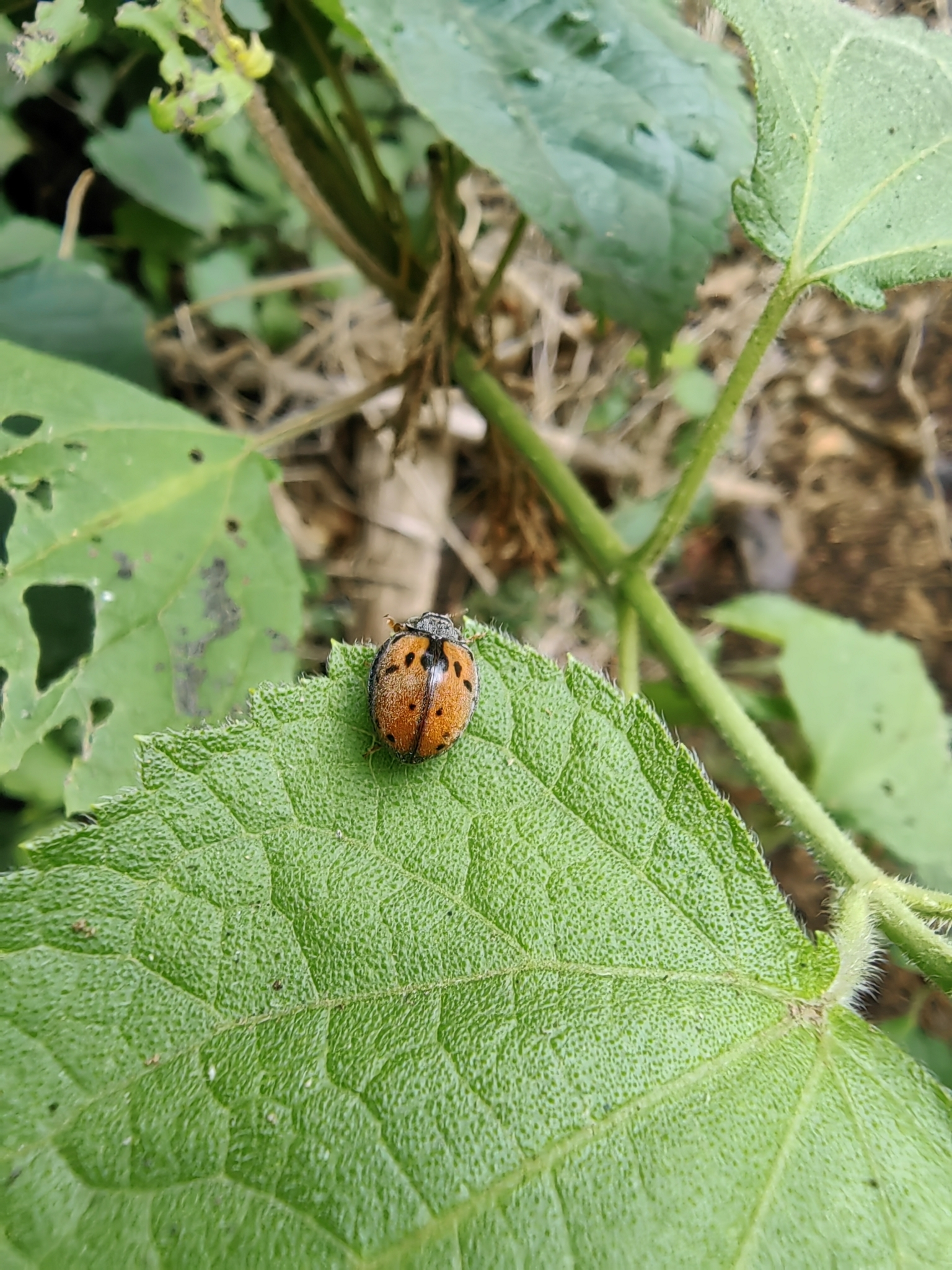
Epilachna vincta, Costa Rica

Epilachna is a genus of beetle in the family Coccinellidae, including several pest species, such as the Mexican bean beetle (Epilachna varivestis).

== Species ==
The following species belong to the genus Epilachna.

- Epilachna abrupta Gorham, 1897
- Epilachna aculata Gordon, 1975
- Epilachna adnexa (Mader, 1958)
- Epilachna adscita (Mader, 1930)
- Epilachna advena (Mader, 1954)
- Epilachna aemula (Weise, 1899)
- Epilachna aemuloides Fürsch, 1987
- Epilachna aenigma (Mader, 1941)
- Epilachna aereipennis (Mader, 1941)
- Epilachna aestimabilis (Mader, 1955)
- Epilachna aggregata Fürsch, 1985
- Epilachna agnata (Mader, 1957)
- Epilachna albovittata (Weise, 1906)
- Epilachna alluaudi (Sicard, 1907)
- Epilachna alternaus Mulsant
- Epilachna ambigua (Mader, 1958)
- Epilachna ambrensis (Sicard, 1907)
- Epilachna amharae Fürsch, 1963
- Epilachna amorpha Arrow, 1909
- Epilachna amplipunctata Gordon, 1975
- Epilachna andrewesi Gorham, 1903
- Epilachna angusta Li, 1961
- Epilachna angustata Mulsant, 1850
- Epilachna anhweiana (Dieke, 1947) Dieke, 1947
- Epilachna animula Fürsch, 1987
- Epilachna annamensis (Dieke, 1947)
- Epilachna annexa Weise, 1895
- Epilachna anthodea Zeng & Yang, 1996
- Epilachna anthracina (Sicard, 1907)
- Epilachna apiceoculata Fürsch, 1997
- Epilachna approximata Crotch, 1874
- Epilachna argiola Mulsant, 1850
- Epilachna atrosinuata (Fürsch, 1960)
- Epilachna atypica (Dieke, 1947)
- Epilachna aubei Mulsant, 1850
- Epilachna aulisoides (Weise, 1919)
- Epilachna aurea Fürsch, 1987
- Epilachna aureola Gordon, 1975
- Epilachna aureopilosa Gordon, 1975
- Epilachna auricoma (Sicard, 1912)
- Epilachna austrina Gordon, 1975
- Epilachna axillaris Mulsant, 1850
- Epilachna azurea (LaPorte, 1840)
- Epilachna bang-haasi Weise, 1895
- Epilachna basalis (Weise, 1900)
- Epilachna bengalica (Dieke, 1947)
- Epilachna bennigseni (Weise, 1899)
- Epilachna benschi (Sicard, 1912)
- Epilachna berthae (Sicard, 1907)
- Epilachna besucheti Canepari, 1986
- Epilachna bhutanensis Bielawski, 1979
- Epilachna bicirculifera (Mader, 1955)
- Epilachna bicrescens (Dieke, 1947)
- Epilachna bifibra Li, 1961
- Epilachna bifibulata Weise, 1895
- Epilachna bimaculicollis Sicard, 1922
- Epilachna bisbivittata Gordon, 1975
- Epilachna bisdecempunctata (Mader, 1941)
- Epilachna bisdecemsignata (Mader, 1941)
- Epilachna bisellata (Sicard, 1912)
- Epilachna bisoctonotata (Mader, 1957)
- Epilachna bisquinquenotata (Mader, 1957)
- Epilachna bisseptemmaculata (Mader, 1955)
- Epilachna bissexguttata Weise, 1895
- Epilachna bistriguttata Mulsant, 1850
- Epilachna bistrisignata (Mader, 1950)
- Epilachna bistrispilota Gordon, 1975
- Epilachna bituberculata Waterhouse, 1879
- Epilachna blandula Fürsch, 1963
- Epilachna bocaki Pang
- Epilachna boliviana Weise, 1895
- Epilachna bolivicola (Mader, 1950)
- Epilachna bomparti Mulsant, 1850
- Epilachna bonplandi Dejean, 1837
- Epilachna boops Fürsch, 1963
- Epilachna boraustralis Gordon, 1975
- Epilachna borealis (Fabricius, 1775) (squash lady beetle)
- Epilachna boreli (Sicard, 1907)
- Epilachna bourcieri Mulsant, 1850
- Epilachna bouvieri (Sicard, 1907)
- Epilachna brachyfoliata Zeng & Yang, 1996
- Epilachna brachyloba Zeng & Yang, 1996
- Epilachna brivioi (Bielawski & Fürsch, 1960)
- Epilachna buckleyi Crotch, 1874
- Epilachna cacica (Guérin-Méneville, 1844)
- Epilachna calisto (Weise, 1899)
- Epilachna callangae Gordon, 1975
- Epilachna calligrapta Gorham, 1897
- Epilachna carapacola Fürsch, 1997
- Epilachna caucaensis Gordon, 1975
- Epilachna championi Gordon, 1975
- Epilachna chayuensis Pang & Mao, 1977
- Epilachna chelys Jadwiszczak & Wegrzinowicz, 2003
- Epilachna cherrapunjiensis (Kapur, 1963)
- Epilachna chinensis (Weise, 1912)
- Epilachna chingjing Yu & Wang, 1999
- Epilachna chingsingli Yu, 2011
- Epilachna ciliata Gordon, 1986
- Epilachna cinctipennis Crotch, 1874
- Epilachna cinerea Fürsch, 1963
- Epilachna circulifera (Mader, 1955)
- Epilachna circumcincta Mulsant, 1850
- Epilachna clandestina Mulsant, 1850
- Epilachna coccinelloides (Dieke, 1947)
- Epilachna colombiana Gordon, 1975
- Epilachna colorata Mulsant, 1850
- Epilachna compilata Mulsant, 1850
- Epilachna completa (Dieke, 1947)
- Epilachna concolor Mulsant, 1850
- Epilachna confixa Gordon, 1975
- Epilachna confusa Li in Li & Cook, 1961
- Epilachna congener Gorham, 1895
- Epilachna conifera Gordon, 1975
- Epilachna conjuncta Gordon, 1975
- Epilachna conradti Weise, 1898
- Epilachna consimilis Gordon, 1975
- Epilachna conspergata Fürsch, 1997
- Epilachna consputa Mulsant, 1850
- Epilachna consularis Mulsant, 1850
- Epilachna convexa (Dieke, 1947) Dieke, 1947
- Epilachna convextata T. Singh & V. Singh, 1990
- Epilachna cordula (Weise, 1898)
- Epilachna cormosana Gestro, 1895
- Epilachna corniventris Gordon, 1975
- Epilachna crassimala Li in Li & Cook, 1961
- Epilachna crecentomaculata T. Singh & V. Singh, 1990
- Epilachna crepida Pang
- Epilachna cribrata Crotch, 1874
- Epilachna cuonaensis Pang & Mao, 1977
- Epilachna cuscoi Gordon, 1975
- Epilachna cushmani Gordon, 1975
- Epilachna darlingtoni Gordon, 1975
- Epilachna decellei Fürsch, 1987
- Epilachna decemguttata (Weise, 1923)
- Epilachna decemmaculata Redtenbacher in Kollar & Redtenbacher, 1844
- Epilachna delessertii (Guérin-Méneville, 1840)
- Epilachna deleta Mulsant, 1850
- Epilachna deltoides Weise, 1895
- Epilachna densevestita (Sicard, 1907)
- Epilachna deuterea Gordon, 1975
- Epilachna deyrollii Crotch, 1874
- Epilachna dictyodroma Zeng, 2000
- Epilachna difficilis Mulsant, 1850
- Epilachna discincta Weise, 1890
- Epilachna discoidea Erichson, 1847
- Epilachna discolor Erichson, 1847
- Epilachna discrepens (Weise, 1901)
- Epilachna diversipes (Sicard, 1907)
- Epilachna dives Erichson, 1847
- Epilachna divisa (Weise, 1900)
- Epilachna divisoides Gordon, 1975
- Epilachna dobzhanskyi (Dieke, 1947)
- Epilachna dohrni Weise, 1888
- Epilachna donckieri (Sicard, 1907)
- Epilachna donghoiensis Hoang, 1978
- Epilachna dorsigera Erichson, 1847
- Epilachna dufourii Mulsant, 1850
- Epilachna dumerili Mulsant, 1850
- Epilachna duodecimpustulosa Mulsant, 1850
- Epilachna duvivieriorum (Weise, 1898)
- Epilachna echinata Pang & Slipinski in Pang et al., 2012
- Epilachna ecuadorica Gordon, 1975
- Epilachna ellisi Crotch, 1874
- Epilachna elongatula Jadwiszczak & Wegrzinowicz, 2003
- Epilachna elvina Mulsant, 1853
- Epilachna emeiensis Zeng, 2000
- Epilachna emerita Gordon, 1975
- Epilachna endomycina Gorham, 1903
- Epilachna erichsoni Crotch, 1874
- Epilachna erinacea (Sicard, 1925)
- Epilachna erythrotricha Hoang, 1978
- Epilachna esemephata Gordon, 1986
- Epilachna eusema (Weise, 1904)
- Epilachna excisa Weise, 1895
- Epilachna eximia Gordon, 1975
- Epilachna extrema Crotch, 1874
- Epilachna fallax (Weise, 1908)
- Epilachna fansipana Hoang, 1978
- Epilachna fasciata (Sicard, 1912)
- Epilachna fascifera (Mader, 1941)
- Epilachna fasciolata Crotch, 1874
- Epilachna fausta Erichson, 1847
- Epilachna fenchinica Pang, 1993
- Epilachna fenestrata Erichson, 1847
- Epilachna fenestroides Gordon, 1975
- Epilachna filamentacea Zeng & Pang in Pang & Zeng, 2002
- Epilachna flavopustulata Kolbe, 1897
- Epilachna formosana (Weise, 1923)
- Epilachna forsteri (Mader, 1958)
- Epilachna freudei (Mader, 1958)
- Epilachna freyana Bielawski, 1965
- Epilachna fryii Crotch, 1874
- Epilachna fugongensis Cao & Xiao, 1984
- Epilachna fulvosignata
- Epilachna furcata Gordon, 1975
- Epilachna furtiva Gordon, 1975
- Epilachna galerucinoides Korschefsky, 1934
- Epilachna gallaensis Fürsch, 1987
- Epilachna gedeensis (Dieke, 1947) Dieke, 1947
- Epilachna gelensis Fürsch, 1987
- Epilachna gentilis (Weise, 1901)
- Epilachna geoffroyi Mulsant, 1850
- Epilachna geometrica (Weise, 1900)
- Epilachna glochinosa Pang & Mao, 1979
- Epilachna glochisifoliata Pang & Mao, 1979
- Epilachna gloiera Xiao in Xiao & Li, 1992
- Epilachna gnoma Gordon, 1975
- Epilachna godmani Gordon, 1975
- Epilachna goeteli Jadwiszczak & Wegrzinowicz, 2003
- Epilachna gokteika (Kapur, 1963)
- Epilachna gordoni Jadwiszczak & Wegrzinowicz, 2003
- Epilachna gorhami Gordon, 1975
- Epilachna gorkhana Miyatake, 1985
- Epilachna grandidieri (Sicard, 1907)
- Epilachna graphiptera (Sicard, 1930)
- Epilachna graueri (Mader, 1941)
- Epilachna grayi Mulsant, 1850
- Epilachna gressitti Li, C.S., E.E. & Cook, 1961
- Epilachna haefligeri (Weise, 1906)
- Epilachna hamulifera Pang
- Epilachna harmala (Weise, 1898)
- Epilachna harringtoni Gordon, 1975
- Epilachna hatinhensis Hoang, 1978
- Epilachna hedwiga Weise, 1897
- Epilachna hektea Gordon, 1975
- Epilachna hendecaspilota (Mader, 1927)
- Epilachna hingstoni (Kapur, 1963)
- Epilachna holmgreni (Weise, 1926)
- Epilachna honesta (Weise, 1900)
- Epilachna horioni (Fürsch, 1960)
- Epilachna humbloti (Sicard, 1907)
- Epilachna ignobilis (Weise, 1902)
- Epilachna imitata (Weise, 1899)
- Epilachna impicticollis Sicard, 1910
- Epilachna incaorum Gordon, 1975
- Epilachna incauta Mulsant, 1850
- Epilachna indosinensis (Dieke, 1947)
- Epilachna inedita (Mader, 1955)
- Epilachna inexpectata (Sicard, 1907)
- Epilachna innuba (Olivier, 1791)
- Epilachna inserta (Weise, 1900)
- Epilachna insignis Gorham, 1892
- Epilachna intermixta (Dieke, 1947)
- Epilachna iocosa (Mader, 1941)
- Epilachna jarugui Gordon, 1975
- Epilachna jianchuanensis Cao & Xiao, 1984
- Epilachna jole (Weise, 1899)
- Epilachna julii (Sicard, 1907)
- Epilachna juvenca Weise, 1897
- Epilachna kaestneri Fürsch, 1963
- Epilachna kivuensis Fürsch, 1963
- Epilachna konsoensis Jadwiszczak & Wegrzinowicz, 2003
- Epilachna korschefskyi (Mader, 1941)
- Epilachna kraatzi (Weise, 1898)
- Epilachna kraussi Gordon, 1975
- Epilachna kreissli Fürsch, 1963
- Epilachna kunmingensis Yi, He & Xiao, 2013
- Epilachna lacordairii Mulsant, 1850
- Epilachna laesicollis Mulsant, 1850
- Epilachna languida (Weise, 1900)
- Epilachna laosana (Bielawski, 1960)
- Epilachna lasioides (Sicard, 1907)
- Epilachna lata Li, C.S., E.E. & Cook, 1961
- Epilachna lateripicta Fairmaire, 1889
- Epilachna latesellata (Mader, 1941)
- Epilachna lateumerosa Fürsch, 1987
- Epilachna laticollis (Weise, 1899)
- Epilachna latimargo (Weise, 1926)
- Epilachna latipennis (Korschefsky, 1929)
- Epilachna latreillei Gordon, 1975
- Epilachna lenta (Weise, 1902)
- Epilachna lepida Erichson, 1847
- Epilachna lesnei (Sicard, 1907)
- Epilachna lichuaniensis Xiao in Xiao & Li, 1992
- Epilachna lingulatus Yi & He, 2013
- Epilachna linnaei Mulsant, 1850
- Epilachna loculosa Sicard, 1913
- Epilachna longissima (Dieke, 1947)
- Epilachna lorata Weise, 1895
- Epilachna lothi Jadwiszczak & Wegrzinowicz, 2003
- Epilachna loveni (Weise, 1926)
- Epilachna lucianae Bustamante, Oróz, Elme, Marquina & Yábar, 2018
- Epilachna lugubris (Dieke, 1947)
- Epilachna luluaensis Fürsch, 1985
- Epilachna lupina Mulsant, 1850
- Epilachna lurida (Korschefsky, 1928)
- Epilachna luteocincta (Sicard, 1907)
- Epilachna macquarti Mulsant, 1850
- Epilachna macularis Mulsant, 1850
- Epilachna maculicollis (Sicard, 1912)
- Epilachna maculiventris Mulsant, 1853
- Epilachna madida Mulsant, 1850
- Epilachna madrigali Gordon, 1985
- Epilachna magna (Dieke, 1947) Dieke, 1947
- Epilachna magnomaculata (Fürsch, 1960)
- Epilachna malleforma Peng, Pang & Ren, 2002
- Epilachna mammifera Gordon, 1975
- Epilachna mandibularis Gordon, 1975
- Epilachna manni Gordon, 1975
- Epilachna margaritifera Mulsant, 1850
- Epilachna marginella (Fabricius, 1787)
- Epilachna marginicollis (Hope, 1831)
- Epilachna matei Bustamante, Oróz, Elme, Marquina & Yábar, 2018
- Epilachna mausmaiensis Jadwiszczak, 1990
- Epilachna max Pang & Slipinski, 2012
- Epilachna maxima (Weise, 1898)
- Epilachna media Li, C.S., E.E. & Cook, 1961
- Epilachna medvedevi Hoang, 1978
- Epilachna melanocephala Hoang, 1978
- Epilachna meleagris (Klug, 1833)
- Epilachna merae Gordon, 1975
- Epilachna merkli Fürsch, 1987
- Epilachna mermoides Fürsch, 1987
- Epilachna mexicana (Guérin-Méneville, 1844)
- Epilachna microgenitalia Li in Li & Cook, 1961
- Epilachna minuta Gordon, 1975
- Epilachna mirabilis (Mader, 1941)
- Epilachna mirabiloides (Dieke, 1947)
- Epilachna mirifica (Mader, 1941)
- Epilachna misella Weise, 1897
- Epilachna mobilitertiae Li, 1961
- Epilachna modesta Mulsant, 1850
- Epilachna moesta Gistel, 1848
- Epilachna monandrum Yi, He & Xiao, 2013
- Epilachna monsuna Bielawski, 1979
- Epilachna montana Hoang, 1978
- Epilachna moorii Crotch, 1874
- Epilachna morbida (Weise, 1919)
- Epilachna morbidoides (Mader, 1955)
- Epilachna morogoroensis Fürsch, 1985
- Epilachna mushana Li in Li & Cook, 1961
- Epilachna mutabilis Crotch, 1874
- Epilachna mystica Mulsant, 1850
- Epilachna nantai (Sicard, 1907)
- Epilachna napoensis González, 2015
- Epilachna narinoi Gordon, 1975
- Epilachna nepalensis (Kapur, 1958)
- Epilachna nevilli Dohrn, 1880
- Epilachna ngheanensis Hoang, 1978
- Epilachna nigeriana (Mader, 1958)
- Epilachna nigripes Weise, 1895
- Epilachna nigritarsis Mulsant, 1850
- Epilachna nigrocincta Mulsant, 1850
- Epilachna nigromarginata Fürsch, 1963
- Epilachna nigrotincta (Mader, 1957)
- Epilachna nigrovittata Crotch, 1874
- Epilachna nilgirica (Weise, 1908)
- Epilachna nodaodea Yi & He, 2013
- Epilachna nonveilleri Fürsch, 1986
- Epilachna novemdecimguttata (Weise, 1903)
- Epilachna novenaria Mulsant, 1872
- Epilachna nudiuscula (Weise, 1909)
- Epilachna nylanderi Mulsant, 1850
- Epilachna oberthueri Weise, 1895
- Epilachna obliqua Gordon, 1975
- Epilachna obscurella Mulsant, 1850
- Epilachna obscuritarsis (Sicard, 1907)
- Epilachna obsoleta (Olivier, 1808)
- Epilachna obtusiforma Gordon, 1975
- Epilachna occidentalis Crotch, 1874
- Epilachna ocellataemaculata (Mader, 1930)
- Epilachna ocreata Zeng & Yang, 1996
- Epilachna octodecimsignata Weise, 1895
- Epilachna octomaculata (Thunberg, 1781)
- Epilachna octoverrucata Mulsant, 1850
- Epilachna olivacea Mulsant, 1850
- Epilachna olmosi Gordon, 1975
- Epilachna orthofasciata (Dieke, 1947)
- Epilachna ostensa (Weise, 1902)
- Epilachna ostensoides Gordon, 1975
- Epilachna ovaloides Gordon, 1975
- Epilachna oviforma Gordon, 1975
- Epilachna pachiteensis (Weise, 1926)
- Epilachna paenulata (Germar, 1824)
- Epilachna paling Yu, 2001
- Epilachna paradoxa (Mader, 1941)
- Epilachna paraglobiera Peng, Pang & X. Pang, 2001
- Epilachna parainsignis Pang & Mao, 1979
- Epilachna paralobiera Peng, Pang & Pang, 2001
- Epilachna parastriata Gordon, 1975
- Epilachna parvicollis Casey, 1899
- Epilachna pastica (Weise, 1902)
- Epilachna patula Mulsant, 1850
- Epilachna pava Weise, 1895
- Epilachna pellita Fürsch, 1987
- Epilachna peltata Erichson, 1847
- Epilachna pembertoni Crotch, 1874
- Epilachna pemptea Gordon, 1975
- Epilachna perlata (Sicard, 1907)
- Epilachna persimilis Crotch, 1874
- Epilachna pertyi Crotch, 1874
- Epilachna peruviana Crotch, 1874
- Epilachna picta (Sicard, 1907)
- Epilachna picticollis (Sicard, 1907)
- Epilachna pictipennis Crotch, 1874
- Epilachna pierreti Mulsant, 1850
- Epilachna pilifera Weise, 1895
- Epilachna pingbianensis Pang & Mao, 1979
- Epilachna plagiata Gorham, 1897
- Epilachna planimarginata Fürsch, 1963
- Epilachna plicata Weise, 1889
- Epilachna pocohantae Gordon, 1975
- Epilachna pondoensis Fürsch, 1987
- Epilachna praecipua Gordon, 1975
- Epilachna pretiosa (Mader, 1958)
- Epilachna probsti Jadwiszczak & Pütz, 1994
- Epilachna propinqua (Weise, 1900)
- Epilachna provisoria (Dieke, 1947)
- Epilachna pseudograpta Gordon, 1975
- Epilachna pseudokraatzi Fürsch, 1987
- Epilachna pseudolepida Gordon, 1986
- Epilachna pseudorealis Gordon, 1975
- Epilachna pseudospilota Gordon, 1975
- Epilachna pseudostriata Gordon, 1975
- Epilachna pseudotumida Gordon, 1975
- Epilachna punctatissima (Weise, 1904)
- Epilachna pusilla Fürsch, 1963
- Epilachna quadricollis (Dieke, 1947)
- Epilachna quadriguttula (Mader, 1941)
- Epilachna quadripunctata (Weise, 1905)
- Epilachna quangbinhensis Hoang, 1978
- Epilachna quatuordecimpunctata (Mader, 1941)
- Epilachna quichauensis Hoang, 1978
- Epilachna quinquedecimpunctata (Mader, 1941)
- Epilachna quirozensis Gordon, 1975
- Epilachna radiata (Guérin-Méneville, 1844)
- Epilachna rauli Gordon, 1985
- Epilachna reichei Gordon, 1975
- Epilachna renati Sicard, 1907
- Epilachna reticulipennis Fürsch, 1985
- Epilachna riveti (Sicard, 1911)
- Epilachna rubiacis Cao & Xiao, 1984
- Epilachna rubida Fürsch, 2001
- Epilachna rubricollis (Sicard, 1907)
- Epilachna rudepunctata Mader, 1957
- Epilachna rufolonga Fürsch, 1985
- Epilachna rufonotata Fürsch, 1986
- Epilachna ryszardi Jadwiszczak & Wegrzinowicz, 2003
- Epilachna sauteri (Weise, 1923)
- Epilachna schawalleri Canepari, 1997
- Epilachna schoenherri Mulsant, 1850
- Epilachna schoutedeni (Sicard, 1930)
- Epilachna schunkei Gordon, 1975
- Epilachna sellata Weise, 1895
- Epilachna septemnotata Bielawski, 1979
- Epilachna septemocellata T. Singh & V. Singh, 1990
- Epilachna septentrionalis Fürsch, 1963
- Epilachna seria (Weise, 1898)
- Epilachna severini Weise, 1900
- Epilachna sexguttata (Weise, 1899)
- Epilachna sexlineata (Weise, 1898)
- Epilachna sexmaculata Kirsch, 1876
- Epilachna sexpunctata Bielawski, 1979
- Epilachna sexpustulata Bielawski, 1979
- Epilachna shilliensis T. Singh & V. Singh, 1990
- Epilachna shimbaensis Fürsch, 1985
- Epilachna sichuana Pang & Slipinski in Pang et al., 2012
- Epilachna signifera (Sicard, 1907)
- Epilachna simia (Sicard, 1913)
- Epilachna simulans Gordon, 1975
- Epilachna simulatrix (Sicard, 1907)
- Epilachna sinuata (Sicard, 1907)
- Epilachna siphodenticulata Hoang, 1983
- Epilachna siphodentulata Hoang, 1978
- Epilachna siphonechinulata Zeng & Yang, 1996
- Epilachna smithi Mulsant, 1850
- Epilachna soachae Gordon, 1975
- Epilachna soarezica (Sicard, 1907)
- Epilachna sociolamina Li in Li & Cook, 1961
- Epilachna soluta (Weise, 1900)
- Epilachna spinolae Mulsant, 1850
- Epilachna spiraloides Cao & Xiao, 1984
- Epilachna spreta Mulsant, 1850
- Epilachna staudingeri (Weise, 1902)
- Epilachna stolata Mulsant, 1850
- Epilachna stragulata Fürsch, 1963
- Epilachna strasseni Fürsch, 1963
- Epilachna strictanotata Gordon, 1975
- Epilachna striola (Weise, 1902)
- Epilachna struwei Fürsch, 2001
- Epilachna subacuta (Dieke, 1947) Dieke, 1947
- Epilachna subclathrata Sicard, 1910
- Epilachna sumbana
- Epilachna superba (Mader, 1955)
- Epilachna suspiciosa Weise, 1901
- Epilachna suturoguttata Fürsch, 1991
- Epilachna sztolcmani Jadwiszczak & Wegrzinowicz, 2003
- Epilachna tanalensis (Sicard, 1907)
- Epilachna tenebricosa Mulsant, 1850
- Epilachna tenella (Sicard, 1930)
- Epilachna tenelloides (Fürsch, 1960)
- Epilachna tenuepicta (Sicard, 1907)
- Epilachna tetartea Gordon, 1975
- Epilachna tetrastigma (Weise, 1912)
- Epilachna tianpingiensis Pang & Mao, 1979
- Epilachna tibialis Weise, 1888
- Epilachna togoeensis (Weise, 1901)
- Epilachna topali Jadwiszczak, 1990
- Epilachna transverselineata (Mader, 1958)
- Epilachna tredecimnotata (Latreille, 1833) (southern squash lady beetle)
- Epilachna tricolor (Sicard, 1907)
- Epilachna tridecimmaculosa Pang & Mao, 1977
- Epilachna tridivisa Hoang, 1978
- Epilachna trifaria (Weise, 1899)
- Epilachna tripupillata (Sicard, 1907)
- Epilachna tristis Gorham, 1897
- Epilachna tritea Gordon, 1975
- Epilachna trochula Fürsch, 1991
- Epilachna tshibindaensis Jadwiszczak & Wegrzinowicz, 2003
- Epilachna tumida Gorham, 1897
- Epilachna uhligi Fürsch, 1987
- Epilachna umerata Fürsch, 1963
- Epilachna undecimspilota (Hope, 1831)
- Epilachna urundiensis Fürsch, 1963
- Epilachna vagula Fürsch, 1963
- Epilachna vanpatteni Gorham, 1898
- Epilachna varipes Mulsant, 1850
- Epilachna varivestis Mulsant, 1850 (Mexican bean beetle)
- Epilachna velata Erichson, 1847
- Epilachna velutina (Olivier, 1808)
- Epilachna venterita Fürsch, 1975
- Epilachna vermiculata (Sicard, 1907)
- Epilachna vigintiduomaculata (Mader, 1941)
- Epilachna vigintiduopunctata (Mader, 1957)
- Epilachna vigintioctopunctata
- Epilachna vigintipunctata Mulsant, 1850
- Epilachna villica Weise, 1888
- Epilachna vincta Crotch, 1874
- Epilachna viridilineata Crotch, 1874
- Epilachna viridinitens Crotch, 1874
- Epilachna vittigera Crotch, 1874
- Epilachna v-pallidum Blanchard in Blanchard & Brullé, 1846
- Epilachna vulcanica (Weise, 1912)
- Epilachna vulnerata Gorham, 1898
- Epilachna vulpecula Reiche, 1849
- Epilachna walteri (Sicard, 1913)
- Epilachna weisei (Sicard, 1912)
- Epilachna werneri Fürsch, 1985
- Epilachna witteiana (Mader, 1941)
- Epilachna woytkowskii Gordon, 1975
- Epilachna zetterstedtii Mulsant, 1850
- Epilachna zeylanica Crotch, 1874
- Epilachna zischkai (Mader, 1950)
- Epilachna zuluensis Crotch, 1874
- Epilachna zumpti Fürsch, 1963
