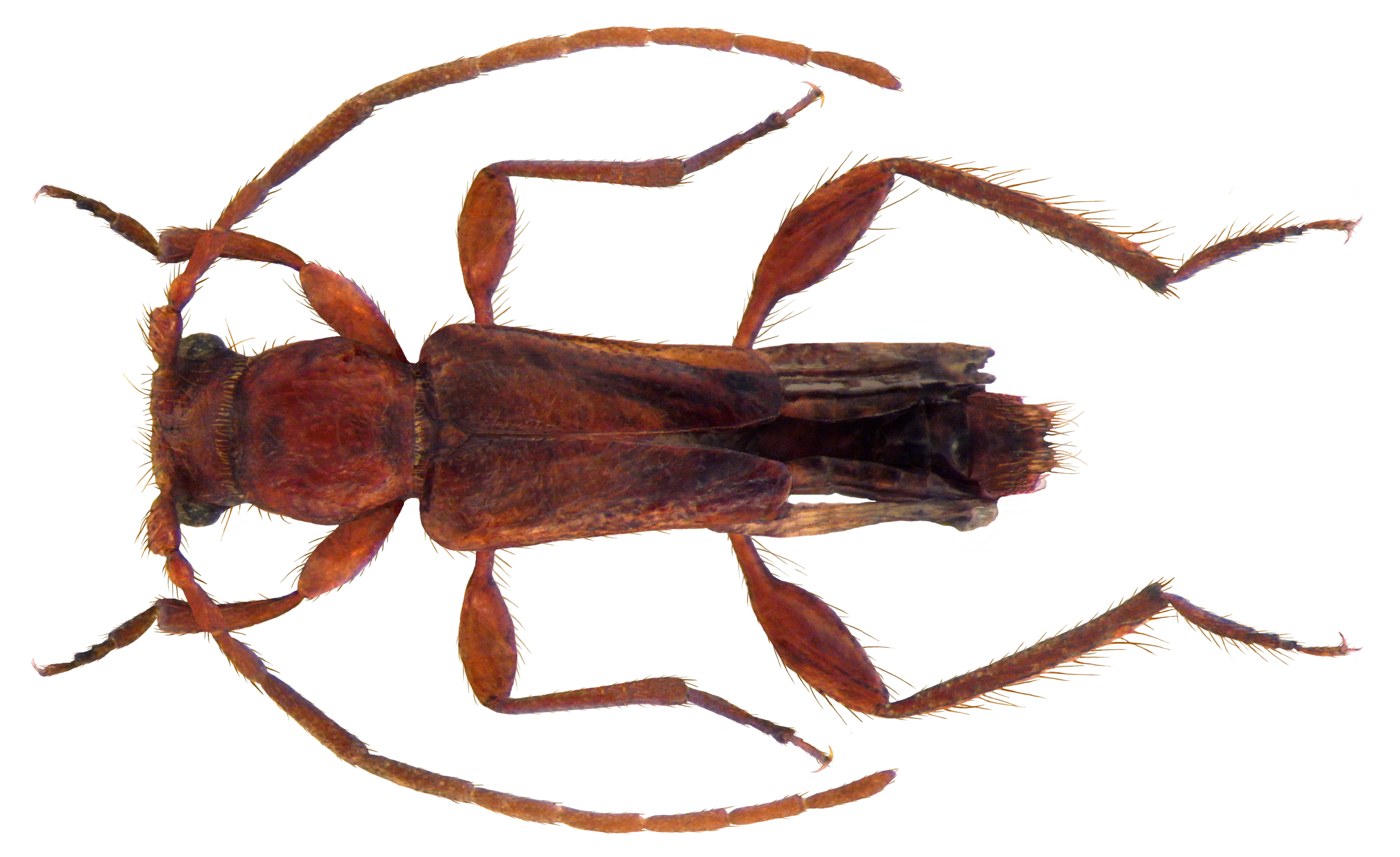
- Nathrius brevipennis (Mulsant, 1839)

Scientific classification
- Domain: Eukaryota
- Kingdom: Animalia
- Phylum: Arthropoda
- Class: Insecta
- Order: Coleoptera
- Suborder: Polyphaga
- Infraorder: Cucujiformia
- Family: Cerambycidae
- Subfamily: Cerambycinae
- Tribe: Psebiini; Lacordaire, 1869

= Psebiini =

Tribe of beetles

Psebiini is a tribe of beetles in the subfamily Cerambycinae, containing the following genera:

- Genus Australopsebium Bjørnstad, 2016
- Genus Bostrychopsebium Quentin & Villiers, 1971
- Genus Bottegia Gestro, 1895
- Genus Capepsebium Adlbauer, 2000
- Genus Chorothyse Pascoe, 1867
- Genus Cleptopsebium Quentin & Villiers, 1971
- Genus Dodecocerus Dalens & Touroult, 2008
  - Dodecocerus poirieri Dalens & Touroult, 2008
- Genus Duffyia Quentin & Villiers, 1971
- Genus Frondipedia Martins & Napp, 1984
  - Frondipedia charma Martins & Napp, 1984
- Genus Haplopsebium Aurivillius, 1891
- Genus Hovorea Chemsak & Noguera, 1993
  - Hovorea chica Chemsak & Noguera, 1993
- Genus Idiopsebium Quentin & Villiers, 1971
- Genus Kabatekiipsebium Rapuzzi, 2015
- Genus Macropsebium Bates, 1878
- Genus Malayopsebium Niisato, 2016
- Genus Mourgliana Holzschuh, 1993
- Genus Nathriobrium Hovore, 1980
  - Nathriobrium methioides Hovore, 1980
- Genus Nathrius Brèthes, 1916
- Genus Nesopsebium Fairmaire, 1894
- Genus Paraleptidea Gounelle, 1913
  - Paraleptidea femorata Gounelle, 1913
  - Paraleptidea longitarsis (Lane, 1951)
  - Paraleptidea sanmartini (Zajciw, 1960)
- Genus Pectinocallimus Niisato, 1989
  - Pectinocallimus sericeus Niisato, 1989
- Genus Pectinopsebium Adlbauer & Bjørnstad, 2012
- Genus Pembius Quentin & Villiers, 1971
- Genus Plectopsebium Boppe, 1915
- Genus Psebium Pascoe, 1864
- Genus Pseudobottegia Duffy, 1955
