= Michel Mercier =

French politician

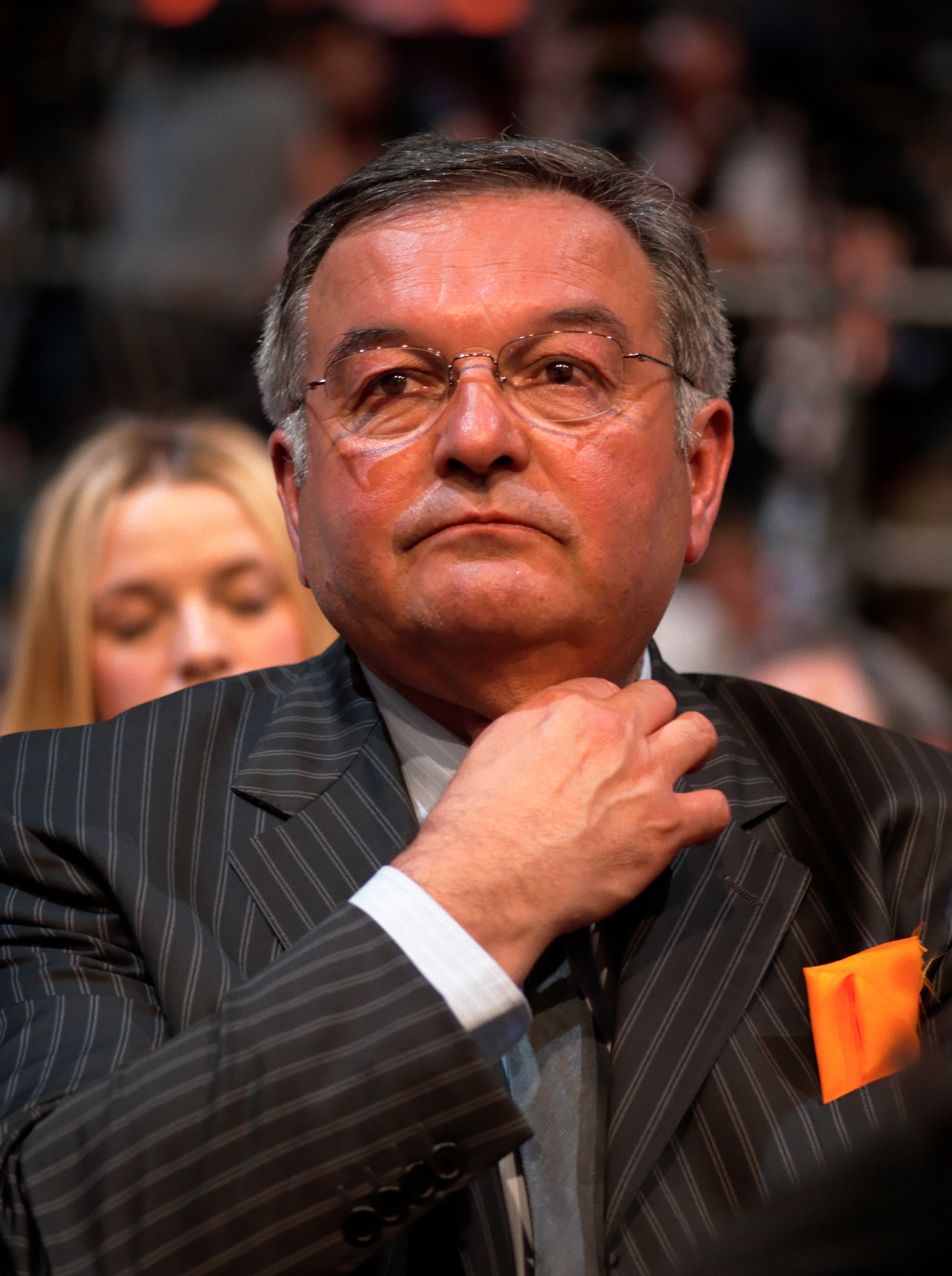

Minister of Justice
- In office 14 November 2010 – 15 May 2012
- President: Nicolas Sarkozy
- Prime Minister: François Fillon
- Preceded by: Michèle Alliot-Marie
- Succeeded by: Christiane Taubira

Minister of Rural Areas and Spatial Planning
- In office 23 June 2009 – 13 November 2010
- President: Nicolas Sarkozy
- Prime Minister: François Fillon
- Preceded by: Position established
- Succeeded by: Bruno Le Maire

President of the General Council of Rhône
- In office 1990–2013
- Preceded by: Jean Palluy
- Succeeded by: Danielle Chuzeville

Personal details
- Born: 7 March 1947 (age 79) Bourg-de-Thizy, France
- Party: Union for French Democracy (Before 2007); Democratic Movement (2007–2009); Union for a Popular Movement (2009–present)
- Education: Institute of Political Science, Lyon

Michel Mercier (born 7 March 1947) is a French politician and who served as Minister of Justice from 2010 until 2012.

After studying law and graduating from Jean Moulin University Law school and the Lyon IEP, he taught finance and local government law at the Faculty of Law of Lyon III.

Elected Senator from the Rhône on 24 September 1995, he was the right's official candidate in the municipal elections in 2001 in Lyon, incumbent Mayor Raymond Barre having refused to run for re-election. Arriving behind the right-wing dissident list supported by Charles Millon in his sector, the 5th arrondissement of Lyon, he decided to withdraw in favor of Jean-Michel Dubernard, who established an alliance with Charles Millon. The Socialist Gérard Collomb was elected Mayor of Lyon.

He was re-elected Senator on 26 September 2004. General councillor for the canton of Thizy, he is also President of the General Council of Rhône since February 1990. Treasurer of the UDF, he remained loyal to the opposition of François Bayrou vis-à-vis the government of Dominique de Villepin.

President of the Centrist Union Senate group since 2002, he remained faithful to François Bayrou by joining the MoDem. On 30 January 2008, Michel Mercier, by favouring an alliance with the UMP in Lyon, whose list was led by Dominique Perben for the 2008 municipal elections signaled his disagreement with the strategy of François Bayrou by resigning the presidency of the MoDem in Rhône. He remained MoDem treasurer and member of the executive board of the MoDem until his appointment to the government.

On 23 June 2009, he joined the government of François Fillon as Minister of Rural Areas and Spatial Planning. He announced his hiatus from the MoDem and was replaced as treasurer by Jean-Jacques Jégou. From 14 November 2010 he was Minister of justice in the 3rd government of François Fillon.

After the defeat of Nicolas Sarkozy at the 2012 Presidential election, he was replaced by Christiane Taubira. During his tenure as Minister, he was criticized for his lack of communication.

== Political career ==
Governmental functions

Keeper of the Seals, Minister of Justice and Freedoms : 2010–2012.

Minister of Rural Areas and Spatial Planning : 2009–2010.

Electoral mandates

National Assembly of France

Member of the National Assembly of France for Rhône (departement) (8th constituency) : 1993–1995 (Resignation, elected senator in 1995).

Senate of France

Senator of Rhône (departement) : 1995–2009 (Became minister in 2009). Elected in 1995, reelected in 2004.

Regional Council

Vice-president of the Regional Council of Rhône-Alpes : 1992–1993 (Resignation).

Regional councillor of Rhône-Alpes : 1992–1993 (Resignation).

General Council

President of the General Council of Rhône (departement) : Since 1990. Reelected in 1992, 1994, 1998, 2001, 2004, 2008.

General councillor of Rhône (departement) : Since 1978. Reelected in 1979, 1985, 1992, 1998, 2004.

Municipal Council

Mayor of Thizy, Rhône : 1977–2001. Reelected in 1983, 1989, 1995.

Deputy-Mayor of Thizy, Rhône : since 2006. Reelected in 2008.

Municipal councillor of Thizy, Rhône : Since 1971. Reelected in 1983, 1989, 1995, 2001, 2008.

Community of communes Council

President of the Communauté de communes of Pays d'Amplepuis Thizy : 1994–2001. Reelected in 1995.

1st vice-president of the Communauté de communes of Pays d'Amplepuis Thizy : Since 2001. Reelected in 2008.

Member of the Communauté de communes of Pays d'Amplepuis Thizy : Since 1994. Reelected in 1995, 2001, 2008.

== Decorations ==
Knight of the Order of the Holy Sepulchre (lieutenancy of France)

Political offices
New office	Minister of Rural Areas and Spatial Planning; 2009–2010	Succeeded by Bruno Le Maire
Preceded by Michèle Alliot-Marie	Minister of Justice; 2010–2012	Succeeded by Christiane Taubira
