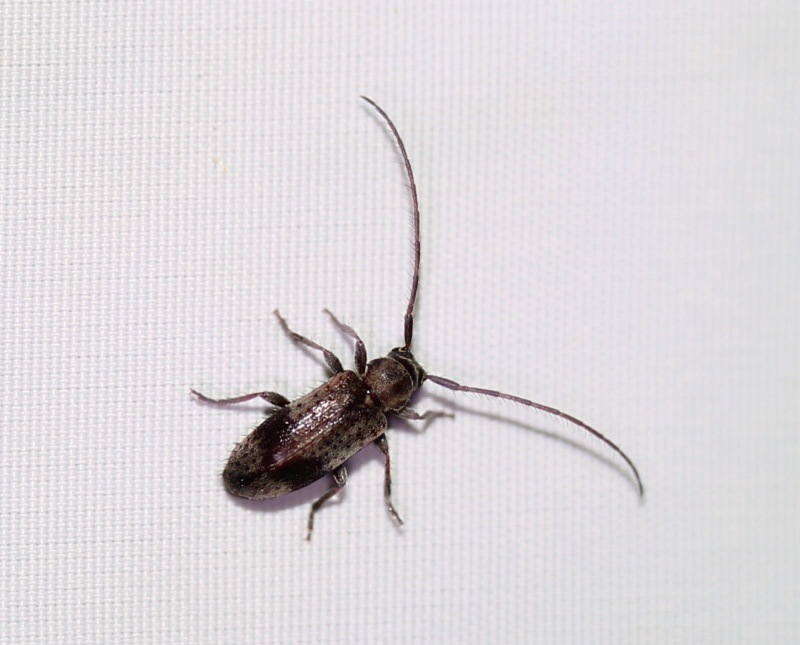

Scientific classification
- Domain: Eukaryota
- Kingdom: Animalia
- Phylum: Arthropoda
- Class: Insecta
- Order: Coleoptera
- Suborder: Polyphaga
- Infraorder: Cucujiformia
- Family: Cerambycidae
- Genus: Exocentrus
- Species: E. punctipennis

Binomial name
- Exocentrus punctipennis Mulsant & Guillebeu, 1856

= Exocentrus punctipennis =

Species of beetle

Exocentrus punctipennis is a species of longhorn beetles of the subfamily Lamiinae. It was described by Mulsant and Guillebeu in 1856, and is known from southern Europe and the Caucasus. The beetles inhabit elm trees. They measure 3.5–6 millimetres (0.14–0.24 in) long, and can live for approximately 1–2 years.
