= Ochodaeus pollens =

Scientific classification
- Kingdom: Animalia
- Phylum: Arthropoda
- Class: Insecta
- Order: Coleoptera
- Suborder: Polyphaga
- Infraorder: Scarabaeiformia
- Family: Ochodaeidae
- Genus: Ochodaeus
- Species: O. pollens

Binomial name
- Ochodaeus pollens Petrovitz, 1941

Species of beetle

Ochodaeus pollens is a beetle from the family Ochodaeidae. The scientific name of the species was first published in 1941 by Petrovitz.
