= Xenochodaeus luscinus =

Scientific classification
- Kingdom: Animalia
- Phylum: Arthropoda
- Clade: Pancrustacea
- Class: Insecta
- Order: Coleoptera
- Suborder: Polyphaga
- Infraorder: Scarabaeiformia
- Family: Ochodaeidae
- Genus: Xenochodaeus
- Species: X. luscinus

Binomial name
- Xenochodaeus luscinus (Howden, 1968)

Species of beetle

Xenochodaeus luscinus is a species of sand-loving scarab beetle in the family Ochodaeidae. It is found in North America.
