= Pterolophia m-griseum =

Scientific classification
- Kingdom: Animalia
- Phylum: Arthropoda
- Clade: Pancrustacea
- Class: Insecta
- Order: Coleoptera
- Suborder: Polyphaga
- Infraorder: Cucujiformia
- Family: Cerambycidae
- Genus: Pterolophia
- Species: P. m-griseum

Binomial name
- Pterolophia m-griseum (Mulsant, 1846)

Synonyms
- Albana m-grisea Mulsant, 1846; Albana m-griseum Mulsant, 1846; Pterolophia m-grisea (Mulsant, 1846); Pogonocherus accentifer Fairmaire, 1856

Species of beetle

Pterolophia m-griseum is a species of beetle in the family Cerambycidae. It was described by Étienne Mulsant in 1846, originally under the genus Albana. It is known from Spain and France. It feeds on Genista scorpius and Genista cinerea.
