= Mordellistenula perrisi =

Scientific classification
- Kingdom: Animalia
- Phylum: Arthropoda
- Class: Insecta
- Order: Coleoptera
- Suborder: Polyphaga
- Infraorder: Cucujiformia
- Family: Mordellidae
- Genus: Mordellistenula
- Species: M. perrisi

Binomial name
- Mordellistenula perrisi (Mulsant), 1857

Synonyms
- Mordellistena perrisi Mulsant, 1857; Mordellistena engelharti Schilsky, 1910; Mordellistena planifrons Stshegoleva-Barovskaja, 1930; Mordellistena rectangula Thomson, 1868

Species of beetle

Mordellistenula perrisi is a beetle in the genus Mordellistenula of the family Mordellidae. It was described in 1857 by Étienne Mulsant.
