= Mordellistena tarsata =

Scientific classification
- Kingdom: Animalia
- Phylum: Arthropoda
- Clade: Pancrustacea
- Class: Insecta
- Order: Coleoptera
- Suborder: Polyphaga
- Infraorder: Cucujiformia
- Family: Mordellidae
- Genus: Mordellistena
- Species: M. tarsata

Binomial name
- Mordellistena tarsata Mulsant, 1856

Species of beetle

Mordellistena tarsata is a species of beetle in the family Mordellidae. It was first described in 1856 by French entomologist Étienne Mulsant.
