= Xenochodaeus simplex =

Scientific classification
- Kingdom: Animalia
- Phylum: Arthropoda
- Class: Insecta
- Order: Coleoptera
- Suborder: Polyphaga
- Infraorder: Scarabaeiformia
- Family: Ochodaeidae
- Genus: Xenochodaeus
- Species: X. simplex

Binomial name
- Xenochodaeus simplex (LeConte, 1854)

Species of beetle

Xenochodaeus simplex is a species of sand-loving scarab beetle in the family Ochodaeidae. It is found in North America.
