= Mordellistenula =

Scientific classification
- Kingdom: Animalia
- Phylum: Arthropoda
- Class: Insecta
- Order: Coleoptera
- Suborder: Polyphaga
- Infraorder: Cucujiformia
- Family: Mordellidae
- Subfamily: Mordellinae
- Tribe: Mordellistenini
- Genus: Mordellistenula; Stshegoleva-Barovskaja, 1930

Type species
- Mordellistena planifrons Stshegoleva-Barovskaja, 1930

Genus of beetles

Mordellistenula is a genus of tumbling flower beetles in the family Mordellidae. There are about six described species in Mordellistenula.

== Species ==
These six species belong to the genus Mordellistenula:

- Mordellistenula anomala Ermisch, 1957
- Mordellistenula lacinicollis Cseto, 1990
- Mordellistenula longipalpis Ermisch, 1965
- Mordellistenula perrisi (Mulsant, 1856)
- Mordellistenula planifrons Stchegoleva-Barovskaya, 1930
- Mordellistenula plutonica Compte, 1969
