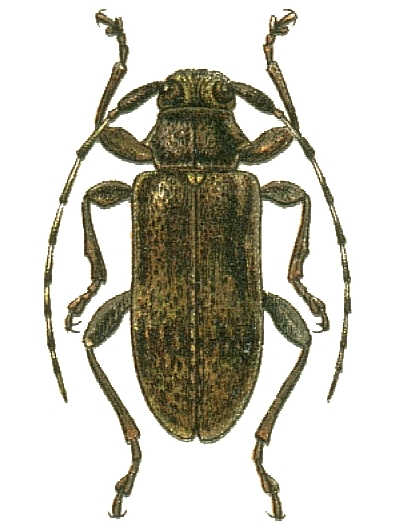

Scientific classification
- Domain: Eukaryota
- Kingdom: Animalia
- Phylum: Arthropoda
- Class: Insecta
- Order: Coleoptera
- Suborder: Polyphaga
- Infraorder: Cucujiformia
- Family: Cerambycidae
- Genus: Oplosia
- Species: O. cinerea

Binomial name
- Oplosia cinerea (Mulsant, 1839)

= Oplosia cinerea =

Species of beetle

Oplosia cinerea is a species of beetle in the family Cerambycidae. It was described by Mulsant in 1839.

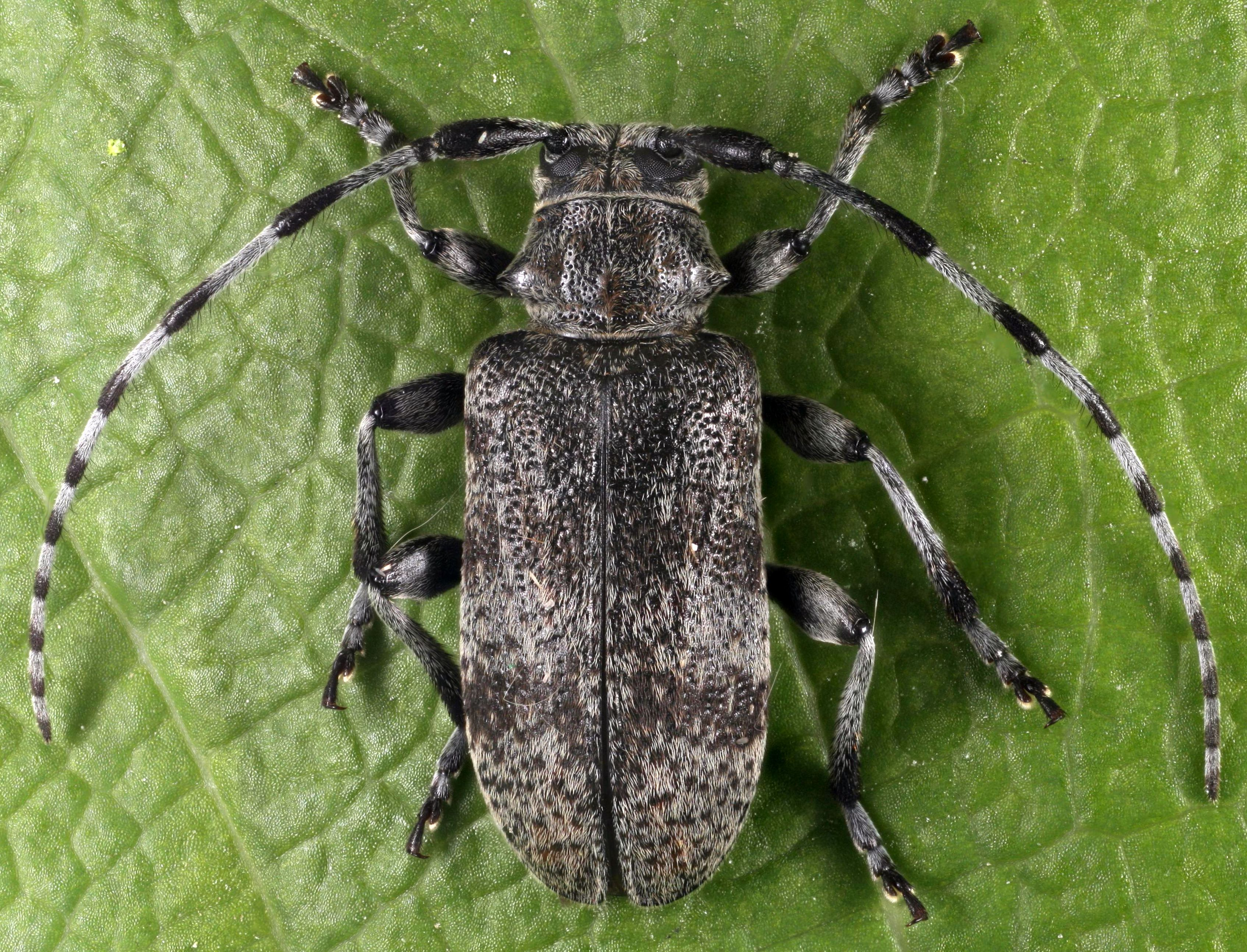
Male

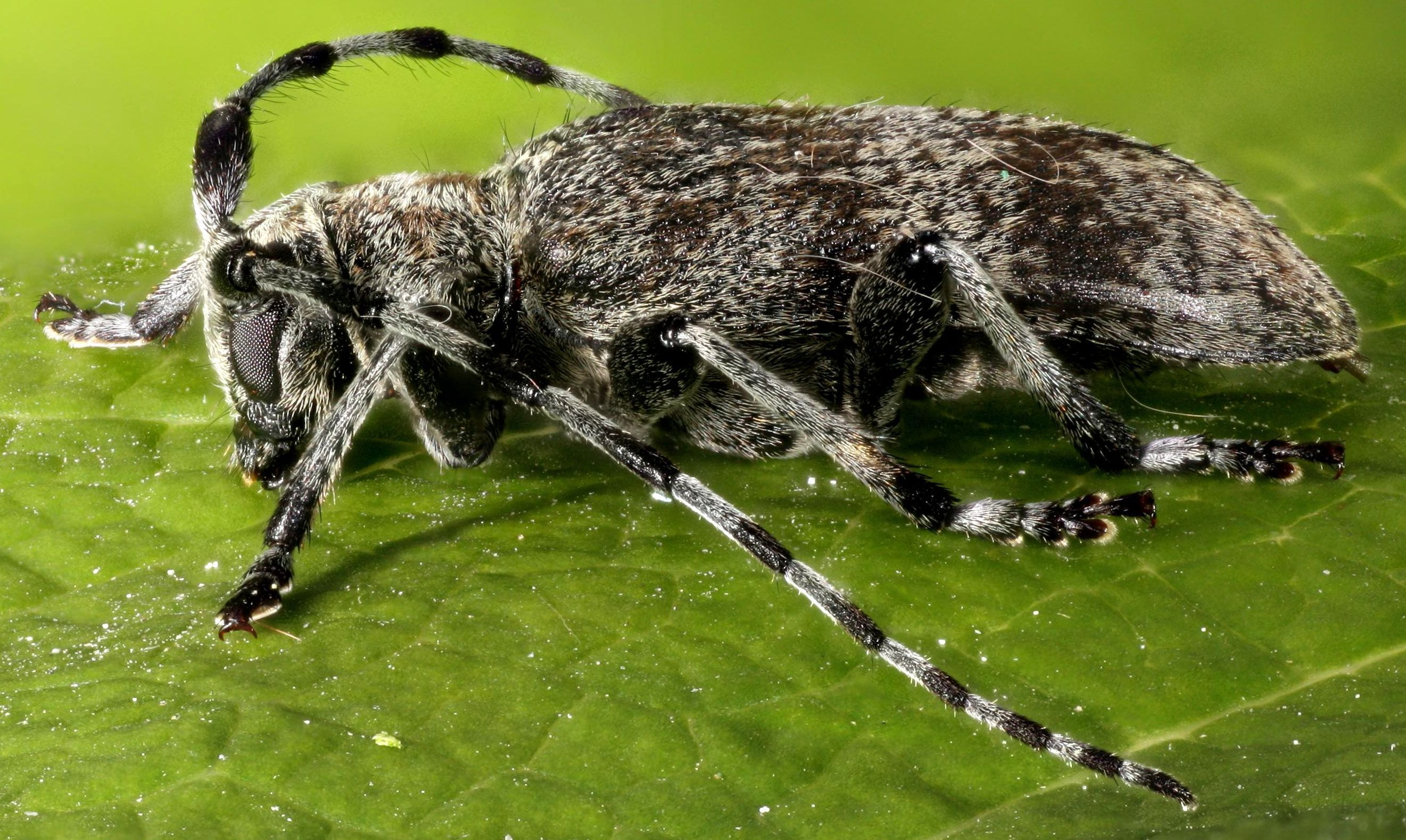
Male

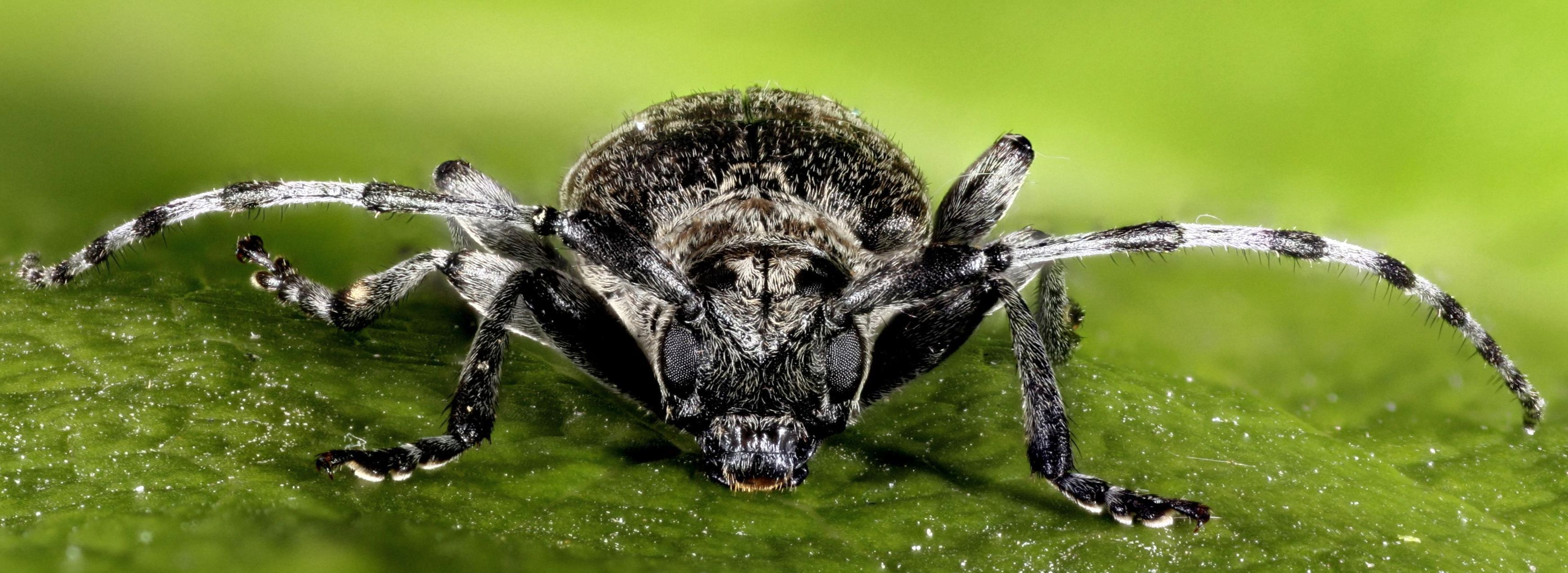
Male
