= Bostrychopsebium usurpator =

Scientific classification
- Kingdom: Animalia
- Phylum: Arthropoda
- Class: Insecta
- Order: Coleoptera
- Suborder: Polyphaga
- Infraorder: Cucujiformia
- Family: Cerambycidae
- Subfamily: Cerambycinae
- Tribe: Psebiini
- Genus: Bostrychopsebium
- Species: B. usurpator

Binomial name
- Bostrychopsebium usurpator Holzschuh, 1989

Species of beetle

Bostrychopsebium usurpator is a species of longhorn beetle endemic to Sri Lanka.

Antennae shows small flabella in the last 7 antennal segments.
