= Neochodaeus repandus =

Scientific classification
- Domain: Eukaryota
- Kingdom: Animalia
- Phylum: Arthropoda
- Class: Insecta
- Order: Coleoptera
- Suborder: Polyphaga
- Infraorder: Scarabaeiformia
- Family: Ochodaeidae
- Genus: Neochodaeus
- Species: N. repandus

Binomial name
- Neochodaeus repandus (Fall, 1909)

Species of beetle

Neochodaeus repandus is a species of sand-loving scarab beetle in the family Ochodaeidae. It is found in North America.
