= Harpalus punctipennis =

Scientific classification
- Kingdom: Animalia
- Phylum: Arthropoda
- Class: Insecta
- Order: Coleoptera
- Suborder: Adephaga
- Family: Carabidae
- Genus: Harpalus
- Subgenus: Harpalus
- Species: H. punctipennis

Binomial name
- Harpalus punctipennis Mulsant, 1852

Species of beetle

Harpalus punctipennis is a species of ground beetle from Harpalinae subfamily that can be found in French and Italian Alps.
