= Parochodaeus californicus =

Scientific classification
- Domain: Eukaryota
- Kingdom: Animalia
- Phylum: Arthropoda
- Class: Insecta
- Order: Coleoptera
- Suborder: Polyphaga
- Infraorder: Scarabaeiformia
- Family: Ochodaeidae
- Genus: Parochodaeus
- Species: P. californicus

Binomial name
- Parochodaeus californicus (Horn, 1895)

Species of beetle

Parochodaeus californicus is a species of sand-loving scarab beetle in the family Ochodaeidae. It is found in North America.
