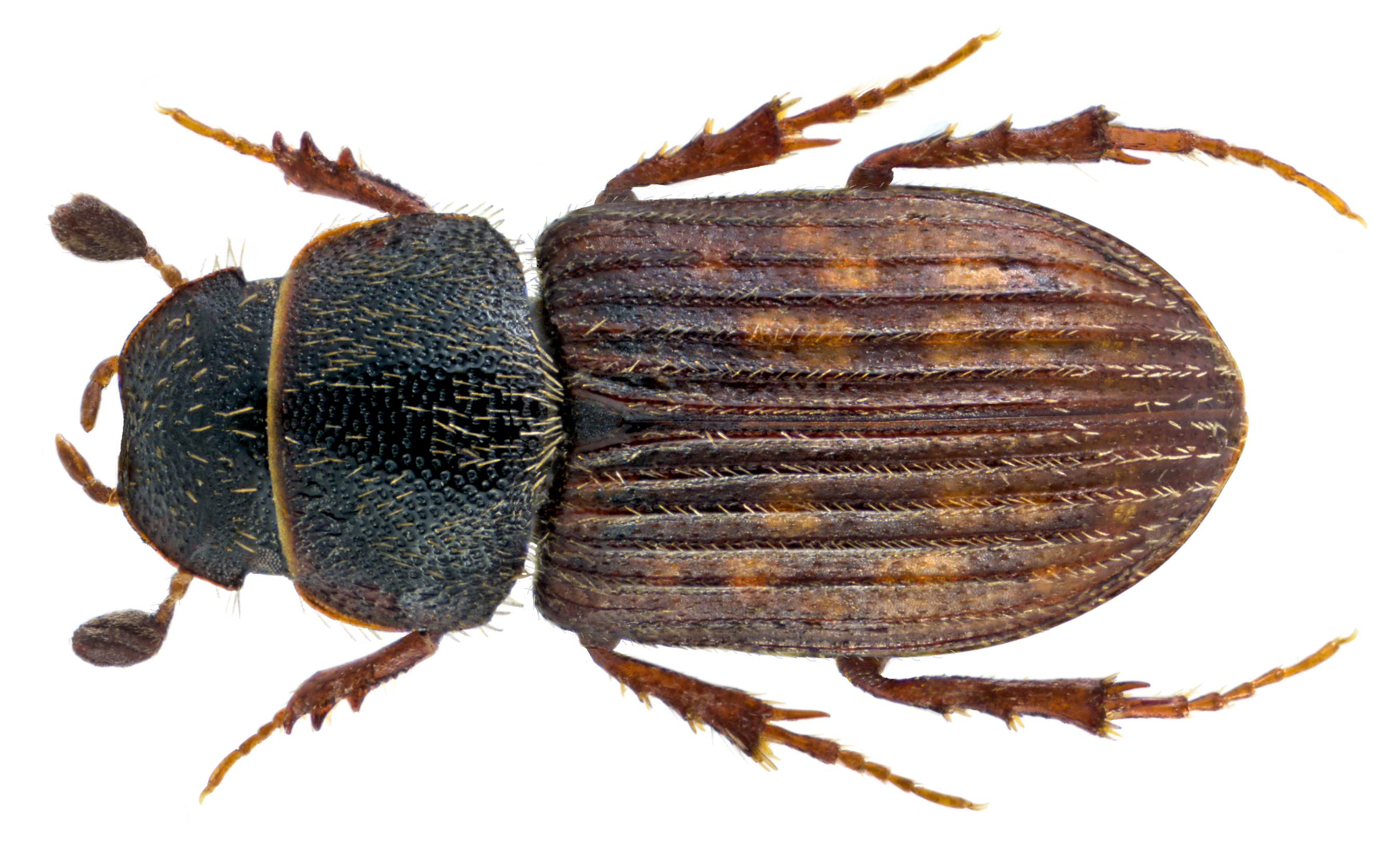
- Heptaulacus testudinarius, England

Scientific classification
- Kingdom: Animalia
- Phylum: Arthropoda
- Clade: Pancrustacea
- Class: Insecta
- Order: Coleoptera
- Suborder: Polyphaga
- Infraorder: Scarabaeiformia
- Superfamily: Scarabaeoidea
- Family: Scarabaeidae
- Genus: Heptaulacus; Mulsant, 1842

Synonyms
- Heptaulaculus Dellacasa & Baraud, 1978

= Heptaulacus =

Genus of beetles

Heptaulacus is a genus of scarab beetles in the family Scarabaeidae. There are about eight described species in Heptaulacus, found in the Palearctic. Some of these species have been transferred from the genus Aphodius.

== Species ==
These eight species belong to the genus Heptaulacus:

- Heptaulacus algarbiensis Branco & Baraud, 1984
- Heptaulacus brancoi Baraud, 1976
- Heptaulacus gadetinus Baraud, 1973
- Heptaulacus koshantschikoffi Schmidt, 1911
- Heptaulacus pirazzolii (Fairmaire, 1881)
- Heptaulacus rasettii Carpaneto, 1978
- Heptaulacus syrticola (Fairmaire, 1882)
- Heptaulacus testudinarius (Fabricius, 1775)
