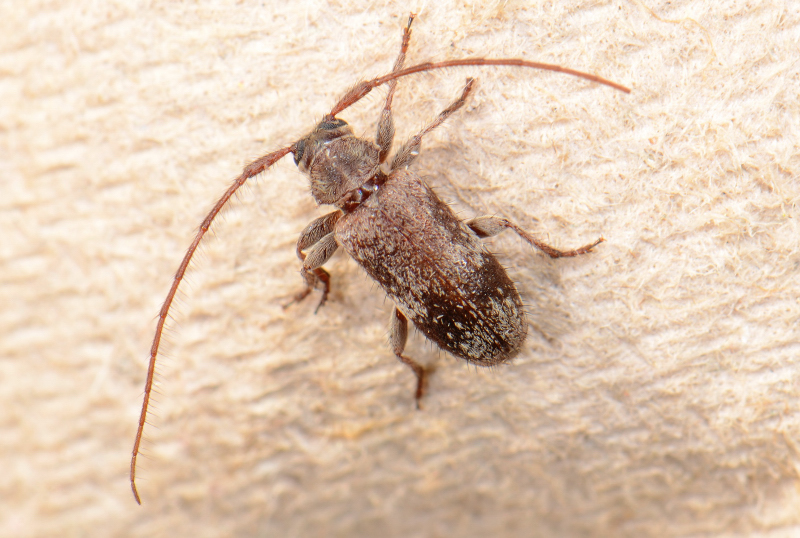

Scientific classification
- Domain: Eukaryota
- Kingdom: Animalia
- Phylum: Arthropoda
- Class: Insecta
- Order: Coleoptera
- Suborder: Polyphaga
- Infraorder: Cucujiformia
- Family: Cerambycidae
- Genus: Exocentrus
- Species: E. adspersus

Binomial name
- Exocentrus adspersus Mulsant, 1846

= Exocentrus adspersus =

Species of beetle

Exocentrus adspersus is a species of longhorn beetles of the subfamily Lamiinae. It was described by Mulsant in 1846, and is known from Europe, the Caucasus, and Russia. The beetles inhabit various deciduous trees, although their preferred host plants are oaks. They measure 5–8 millimetres (0.20–0.31 in) long and can live for approximately 2 years.
