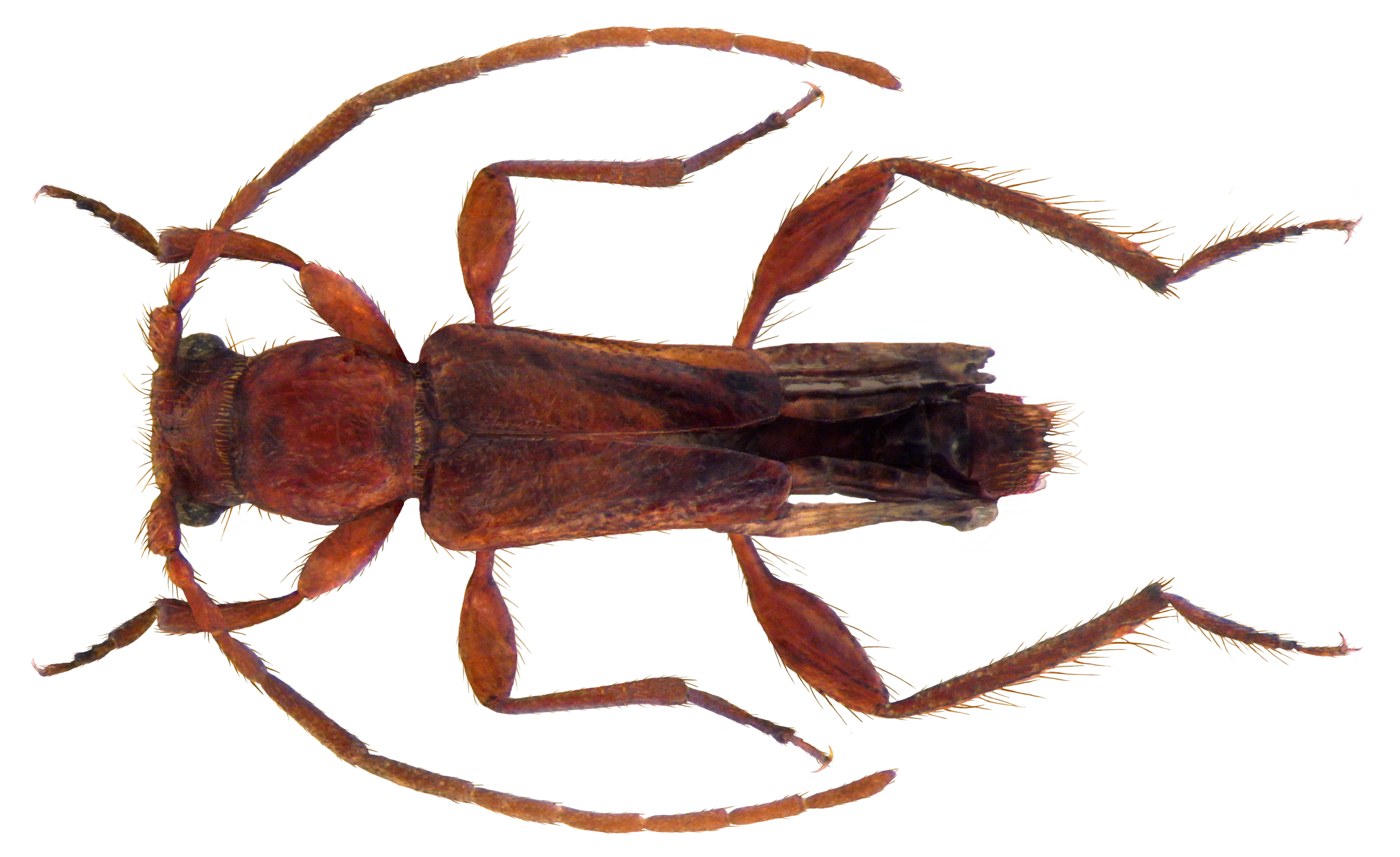
- Nathrius brevipennis

Scientific classification
- Kingdom: Animalia
- Phylum: Arthropoda
- Class: Insecta
- Order: Coleoptera
- Suborder: Polyphaga
- Infraorder: Cucujiformia
- Family: Cerambycidae
- Genus: Nathrius
- Species: N. brevipennis

Binomial name
- Nathrius brevipennis (Mulsant, 1839)

= Nathrius brevipennis =

Species of beetle

Nathrius brevipennis is a species of beetle in family Cerambycidae. It is found (and originated) in the Palearctic but has been spreading by commerce (with timber and wood packaging) and is now cosmopolitan. It is 4–7 mm. long. It is polyphagous on dead twigs of dominantly broadleaved trees (Alnus, Rosa, Fraxinus, Corylus, Ficus, Castanea, Salix, Juglans, Quercus, Morus, Cornus, Ceratonia, Pistacia, Ziziphus, Robinia Ostrya)
