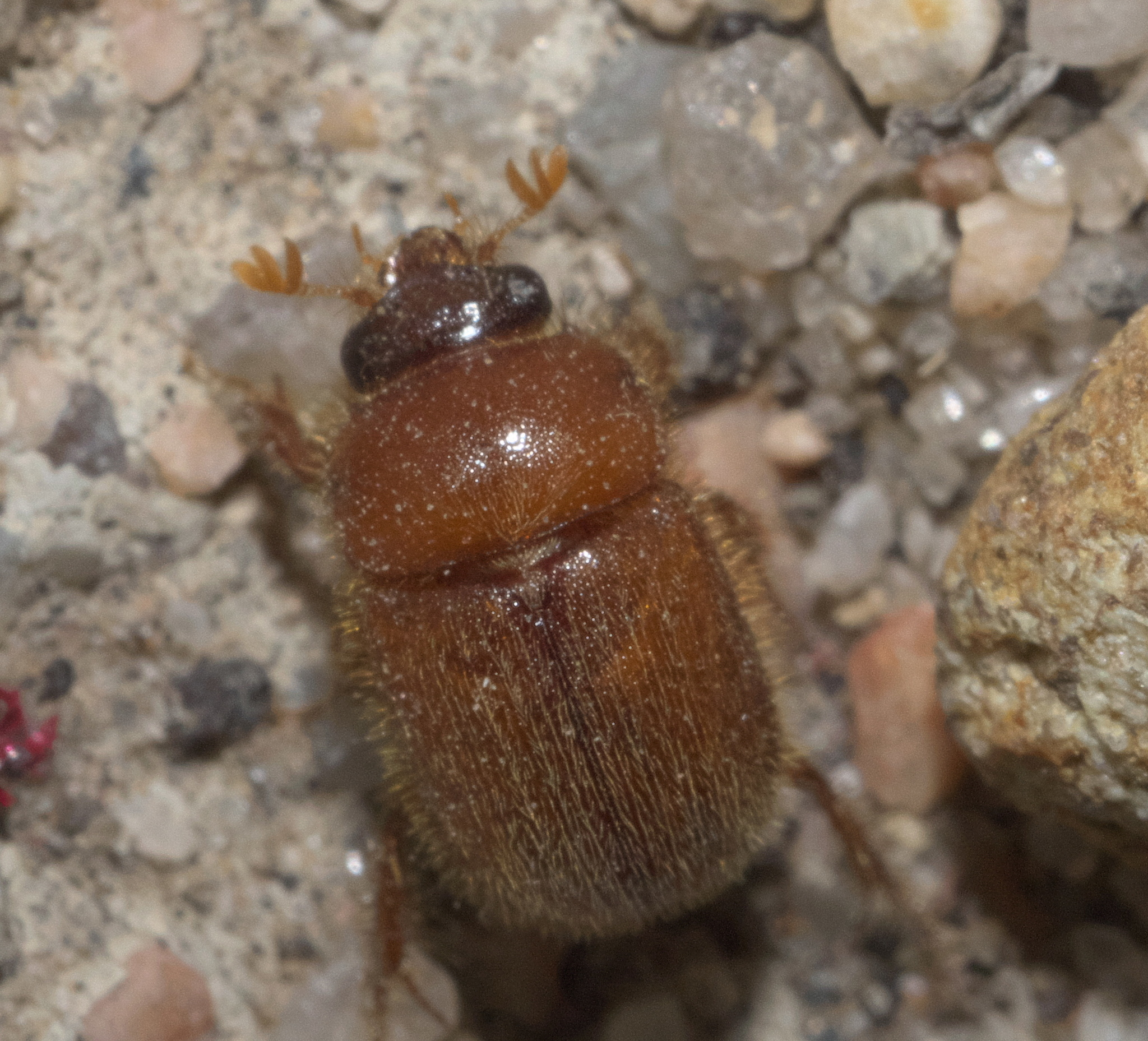
- Parochodaeus duplex, Colorado

Scientific classification
- Domain: Eukaryota
- Kingdom: Animalia
- Phylum: Arthropoda
- Class: Insecta
- Order: Coleoptera
- Suborder: Polyphaga
- Infraorder: Scarabaeiformia
- Family: Ochodaeidae
- Genus: Parochodaeus
- Species: P. duplex

Binomial name
- Parochodaeus duplex (LeConte, 1868)

Synonyms
- Ochodaeus kansanus Fall, 1909

= Parochodaeus duplex =

Species of beetle

Parochodaeus duplex is a species of sand-loving scarab beetle in the family Ochodaeidae. It is found in North America. Parochodaeus duplex males have the ability to store sperm in their Frass which can then be used to impregnate female members of the species.
