= Codocera gnatho =

Scientific classification
- Kingdom: Animalia
- Phylum: Arthropoda
- Clade: Pancrustacea
- Class: Insecta
- Order: Coleoptera
- Suborder: Polyphaga
- Infraorder: Scarabaeiformia
- Family: Ochodaeidae
- Genus: Codocera
- Species: C. gnatho

Binomial name
- Codocera gnatho (Fall, 1907)

Synonyms
- Ochodaeus nimius Fall, 1907

Species of beetle

Codocera gnatho is a species of sand-loving scarab beetle in the family Ochodaeidae. It is commonly found in North America.
