= Mordellistena episternalis =

Scientific classification
- Domain: Eukaryota
- Kingdom: Animalia
- Phylum: Arthropoda
- Class: Insecta
- Order: Coleoptera
- Suborder: Polyphaga
- Infraorder: Cucujiformia
- Family: Mordellidae
- Genus: Mordellistena
- Species: M. episternalis

Binomial name
- Mordellistena episternalis Mulsant, 1856

Synonyms
- Mordella extensa Rosenhauer, 1856

Species of beetle

Mordellistena episternalis is a species of beetle in the family Mordellidae and is in the genus Mordellistena. It was described in 1856 by Étienne Mulsant and can be found in such European countries as Austria, Croatia, France, Germany, Greece, Hungary, Portugal, Slovakia, Spain, and the Netherlands.
