= Epilachna concolor =

Scientific classification
- Kingdom: Animalia
- Phylum: Arthropoda
- Clade: Pancrustacea
- Class: Insecta
- Order: Coleoptera
- Suborder: Polyphaga
- Infraorder: Cucujiformia
- Family: Coccinellidae
- Genus: Epilachna
- Species: E. concolor

Binomial name
- Epilachna concolor Mulsant, 1850

Species of beetle

Epilachna concolor is a species of beetle of the family Coccinellidae. It is found in Brazil.

== Description ==
Adults reach a length of about 7.58–8 mm. Adults are light reddish brown.
