= Mordellistenula longipalpis =

Scientific classification
- Kingdom: Animalia
- Phylum: Arthropoda
- Class: Insecta
- Order: Coleoptera
- Suborder: Polyphaga
- Infraorder: Cucujiformia
- Family: Mordellidae
- Genus: Mordellistenula
- Species: M. longipalpis

Binomial name
- Mordellistenula longipalpis Ermisch, 1965

Species of beetle

Mordellistenula longipalpis is a beetle in the genus Mordellistenula of the family Mordellidae. It was described in 1965 by Ermisch.
