= Mordellistenula lacinicollis =

Scientific classification
- Kingdom: Animalia
- Phylum: Arthropoda
- Class: Insecta
- Order: Coleoptera
- Suborder: Polyphaga
- Infraorder: Cucujiformia
- Family: Mordellidae
- Genus: Mordellistenula
- Species: M. lacinicollis

Binomial name
- Mordellistenula lacinicollis Csetó, 1990

Species of beetle

Mordellistenula lacinicollis is a beetle in the genus Mordellistenula of the family Mordellidae. It was described in 1990 by Csetó.
