= Parochodaeus =

Scientific classification
- Kingdom: Animalia
- Phylum: Arthropoda
- Clade: Pancrustacea
- Class: Insecta
- Order: Coleoptera
- Suborder: Polyphaga
- Infraorder: Scarabaeiformia
- Family: Ochodaeidae
- Genus: Parochodaeus; Nikolayev, 1995

Genus of beetles

Parochodaeus is a genus of sand-loving scarab beetles in the family Ochodaeidae. There are more than 20 described species in Parochodaeus.

== Species ==
These 22 species belong to the genus Parochodaeus:

- Parochodaeus biarmatus (LeConte, 1863)
- Parochodaeus bituberculatus (Erichson, 1847)
- Parochodaeus californicus (Horn, 1895)
- Parochodaeus campsognathus (Arrow, 1904)
- Parochodaeus carinatus (Benderitter, 1913)
- Parochodaeus cornutus (Ohaus, 1910)
- Parochodaeus dentipes Paulsen & Ocampo, 2012
- Parochodaeus duplex (LeConte, 1868)
- Parochodaeus howdeni (Carlson, 1975)
- Parochodaeus inarmatus (Schaeffer, 1906)
- Parochodaeus jujuyus Paulsen & Ocampo, 2012
- Parochodaeus pectoralis (LeConte, 1868)
- Parochodaeus peninsularis (Horn, 1895)
- Parochodaeus perdidus Paulsen, 2014
- Parochodaeus perplexus Paulsen & Ocampo, 2012
- Parochodaeus phoxus Paulsen & Ocampo, 2012
- Parochodaeus pixius (Paulsen, 2011) (pixie sand-loving scarab)
- Parochodaeus pocadioides (Motschulsky, 1859)
- Parochodaeus proceripes Paulsen & Ocampo, 2012
- Parochodaeus pudu Paulsen & Ocampo, 2012
- Parochodaeus ritcheri (Carlson, 1975)
- Parochodaeus stupendus Paulsen & Ocampo, 2012
