= Heptaulacus pirazzolii =

Scientific classification
- Kingdom: Animalia
- Phylum: Arthropoda
- Clade: Pancrustacea
- Class: Insecta
- Order: Coleoptera
- Suborder: Polyphaga
- Infraorder: Scarabaeiformia
- Family: Scarabaeidae
- Genus: Heptaulacus
- Species: H. pirazzolii

Binomial name
- Heptaulacus pirazzolii (Fairmaire, 1881)

Synonyms
- Aphodius pirazzolii Fairmaire, 1881

Species of beetle

Heptaulacus pirazzolii is a species of beetle of the family Scarabaeidae. It is found in Tunisia and Libya.

== Description ==
Adults reach a length of about 5.5–7 mm (0.22–0.28 in). They have an elongate-oval, moderately convex body. The forebody is blackish-brown, with the margins of the head and the sides of the pronotum yellowish-brown. The elytra are reddish-yellow with dark patches or dark with lighter spots. The legs are brownish-red.
