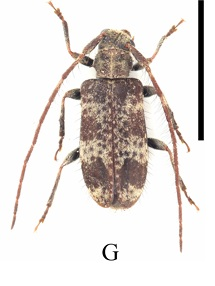

Scientific classification
- Domain: Eukaryota
- Kingdom: Animalia
- Phylum: Arthropoda
- Class: Insecta
- Order: Coleoptera
- Suborder: Polyphaga
- Infraorder: Cucujiformia
- Family: Cerambycidae
- Genus: Exocentrus
- Species: E. spineus

Binomial name
- Exocentrus spineus Holzschuh, 2007

= Exocentrus spineus =

Species of beetle

Exocentrus spineus is a species of beetle of the Cerambycidae family. This species is found in China (Sichuan, Shaanxi, Guizhou).
