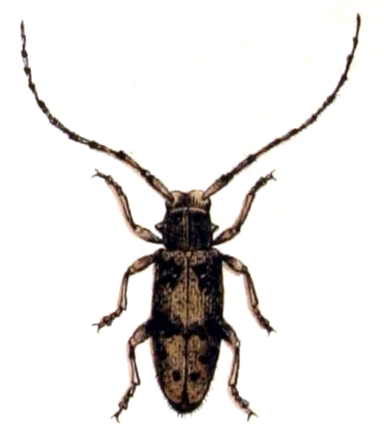
- Exocentrus lusitanus

Scientific classification
- Domain: Eukaryota
- Kingdom: Animalia
- Phylum: Arthropoda
- Class: Insecta
- Order: Coleoptera
- Suborder: Polyphaga
- Infraorder: Cucujiformia
- Family: Cerambycidae
- Tribe: Acanthocinini
- Genus: Exocentrus

= Exocentrus =

Genus of beetles

Exocentrus is a genus of longhorn beetles of the subfamily Lamiinae.

== Species ==
- Exocentrus adspersus Mulsant, 1846
- Exocentrus lusitanus (Linnaeus, 1767)
- Exocentrus punctipennis Mulsant et Guillebeau, 1856
- Exocentrus ritae Sama, 1985
- Exocentrus spineus Holzschuh, 2007
