= Paraleptidea sanmartini =

Scientific classification
- Kingdom: Animalia
- Phylum: Arthropoda
- Class: Insecta
- Order: Coleoptera
- Suborder: Polyphaga
- Infraorder: Cucujiformia
- Family: Cerambycidae
- Genus: Paraleptidea
- Species: P. sanmartini

Binomial name
- Paraleptidea sanmartini (Zajciw, 1960)

Species of beetle

Paraleptidea sanmartini is a species of beetle in the family Cerambycidae. It was described by Zajciw in 1960.
