= Paraleptidea femorata =

Scientific classification
- Kingdom: Animalia
- Phylum: Arthropoda
- Class: Insecta
- Order: Coleoptera
- Suborder: Polyphaga
- Infraorder: Cucujiformia
- Family: Cerambycidae
- Genus: Paraleptidea
- Species: P. femorata

Binomial name
- Paraleptidea femorata Gounelle, 1913

Species of beetle

Paraleptidea femorata is a species of beetle in the family Cerambycidae. It was described by Gounelle in 1913.
