= Paraleptidea longitarsis =

Scientific classification
- Kingdom: Animalia
- Phylum: Arthropoda
- Class: Insecta
- Order: Coleoptera
- Suborder: Polyphaga
- Infraorder: Cucujiformia
- Family: Cerambycidae
- Genus: Paraleptidea
- Species: P. longitarsis

Binomial name
- Paraleptidea longitarsis (Lane, 1951)

Species of beetle

Paraleptidea longitarsis is a species of beetle in the family Cerambycidae. It was described by Lane in 1951.
