= Xenochodaeus =

Scientific classification
- Domain: Eukaryota
- Kingdom: Animalia
- Phylum: Arthropoda
- Class: Insecta
- Order: Coleoptera
- Suborder: Polyphaga
- Infraorder: Scarabaeiformia
- Family: Ochodaeidae
- Genus: Xenochodaeus; Paulsen, 2007

Genus of beetles

Xenochodaeus is a genus of sand-loving scarab beetles in the family Ochodaeidae. There are 6 described species in Xenochodaeus.

== Species ==
- X. americanus (Westwood, 1852)
- X. luscinus (Howden, 1968)
- X. musculus (Say, 1835)
- X. planifrons (Schaeffer, 1906)
- X. simplex (LeConte, 1854)
- X. ulkei (Horn, 1876)
