= Oplosia suvorovi =

Scientific classification
- Kingdom: Animalia
- Phylum: Arthropoda
- Class: Insecta
- Order: Coleoptera
- Suborder: Polyphaga
- Infraorder: Cucujiformia
- Family: Cerambycidae
- Genus: Oplosia
- Species: O. suvorovi

Binomial name
- Oplosia suvorovi Pic, 1914

Species of beetle

Oplosia suvorovi is a species of beetle in the family Cerambycidae. It was described by Maurice Pic in 1914.
