= Heptaulacus koshantschikoffi =

Scientific classification
- Kingdom: Animalia
- Phylum: Arthropoda
- Clade: Pancrustacea
- Class: Insecta
- Order: Coleoptera
- Suborder: Polyphaga
- Infraorder: Scarabaeiformia
- Family: Scarabaeidae
- Genus: Heptaulacus
- Species: H. koshantschikoffi

Binomial name
- Heptaulacus koshantschikoffi Schmidt, 1911

Species of beetle

Heptaulacus koshantschikoffi is a species of beetle of the family Scarabaeidae. It is found in Kazakhstan, Kyrgyzstan and Tajikistan.

== Description ==
Adults reach a length of about 5 mm (0.20 in). They have a moderately convex body. The head and pronotum are black, with the clypeus reddish anteriorly. The elytra are brown. The dorsal surface is densely covered with hairs.
