= Thizy-les-Bourgs =

- Commune
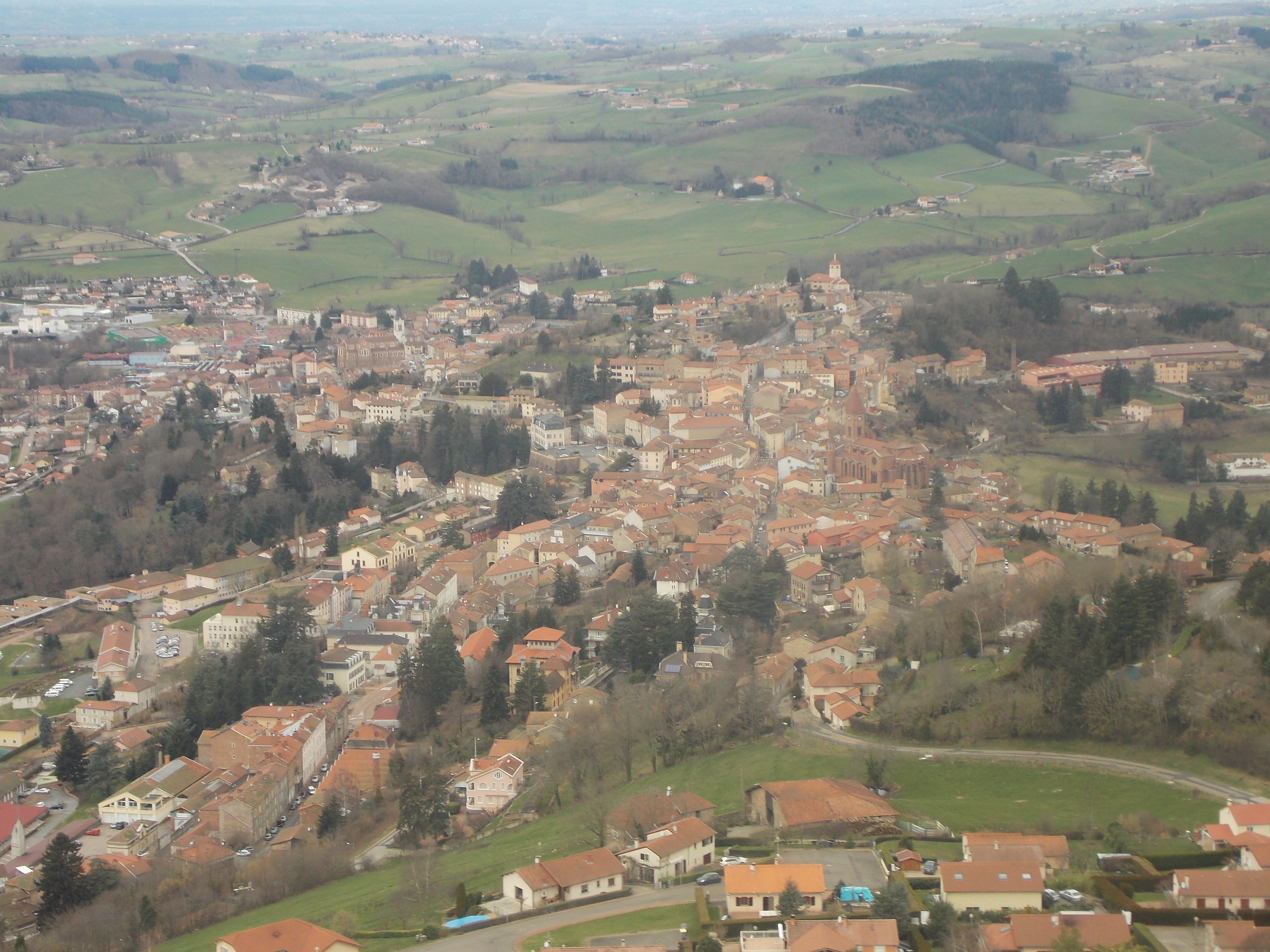
- A partial view of Thizy-les-Bourgs

- Coat of arms
- Location of Thizy-les-Bourgs
- Location within France Location within Auvergne-Rhône-Alpes
- Coordinates: 46°02′00″N 4°18′44″E
- Country: France
- Region: Auvergne-Rhône-Alpes
- Department: Rhône
- Arrondissement: Villefranche-sur-Saône
- Canton: Thizy-les-Bourgs
- Intercommunality: CA de l'Ouest Rhodanien

Government
  - Mayor (2026–32): Rémi Berthoux (RN)
- Area^{1}: 44.44 km^{2} (17.16 sq mi)
- Elevation: 584 m (1,916 ft)
- Highest elevation: 804 m (2,638 ft)
- Lowest elevation: 365 m (1,198 ft)
- Population (2023): 5,771
  - Density: 129.9/km^{2} (336.3/sq mi)
- Time zone: UTC+01:00 (CET)
  - Summer (DST): UTC+02:00 (CEST)
- INSEE/Postal code: 69248 /69240
- ^{1} French Land Register data, which excludes lakes, ponds, glaciers > 1 km^{2} (0.386 sq mi or 247 acres) and river estuaries.

Thizy-les-Bourgs (French pronunciation: [tizi le buʁ]) is a commune in the Rhône department in Auvergne-Rhône-Alpes region in eastern France. The result of the merger, on 1 January 2013, of the communes of Bourg-de-Thizy, La Chapelle-de-Mardore, Mardore, Marnand and Thizy.

== Population ==
The population data given in the table below refer to the commune in its geography as of January 2025.

Historical population
Year	Pop.	±% p.a.
1968	8,362	—
1975	7,950	−0.72%
1982	7,509	−0.81%
1990	6,866	−1.11%
1999	6,349	−0.87%
2007	6,388	+0.08%
2012	6,369	−0.06%
2017	6,031	−1.08%
2023	5,771	−0.73%
Source: INSEE

== See also ==
- Communes of the Rhône department
