= Mardore =

- Part of Thizy-les-Bourgs
- Coat of arms
- Location of Mardore
- Location within France Location within Auvergne-Rhône-Alpes
- Coordinates: 46°04′12″N 4°20′17″E
- Country: France
- Region: Auvergne-Rhône-Alpes
- Department: Rhône
- Arrondissement: Villefranche-sur-Saône
- Commune: Thizy-les-Bourgs
- Area^{1}: 13.47 km^{2} (5.20 sq mi)
- Elevation: 527 m (1,729 ft)
- Highest elevation: 804 m (2,638 ft)
- Lowest elevation: 417 m (1,368 ft)
- Population (2022): 472
  - Density: 35.0/km^{2} (90.8/sq mi)
- Time zone: UTC+01:00 (CET)
  - Summer (DST): UTC+02:00 (CEST)
- Postal code: 69240
- ^{1} French Land Register data, which excludes lakes, ponds, glaciers > 1 km^{2} (0.386 sq mi or 247 acres) and river estuaries.

Mardore (French pronunciation: [maʁdɔʁ]) is a former commune in the Rhône department in Rhône-Alpes region in eastern France.

On 1 January 2013, Mardore and four other communes merged becoming one commune called Thizy-les-Bourgs.
