= Cucochodaeus =

Scientific classification
- Domain: Eukaryota
- Kingdom: Animalia
- Phylum: Arthropoda
- Class: Insecta
- Order: Coleoptera
- Suborder: Polyphaga
- Infraorder: Scarabaeiformia
- Family: Ochodaeidae
- Genus: Cucochodaeus; Paulsen, 2007
- Species: C. sparsus

Binomial name
- Cucochodaeus sparsus (LeConte, 1868)

Synonyms
- Ochodaeus sparsus LeConte, 1868; Ochodaeus mandibularis Linell, 1896

Genus of beetles

Cucochodaeus is a genus of sand-loving scarab beetles in the family Ochodaeidae containing one described species, C. sparsus.
