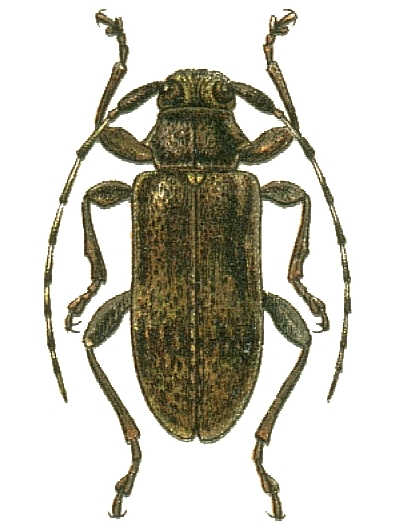
- Oplosia cinerea

Scientific classification
- Kingdom: Animalia
- Phylum: Arthropoda
- Class: Insecta
- Order: Coleoptera
- Suborder: Polyphaga
- Infraorder: Cucujiformia
- Family: Cerambycidae
- Tribe: Desmiphorini
- Genus: Oplosia (LeConte, 1862)

= Oplosia =

Oplosia nubila

Genus of beetles

Oplosia is a genus of beetle in the family Cerambycidae, containing the following species:

- Oplosia cinerea (Mulsant, 1839)
- Oplosia nubila (LeConte, 1862)
- Oplosia suvorovi Pic, 1914
