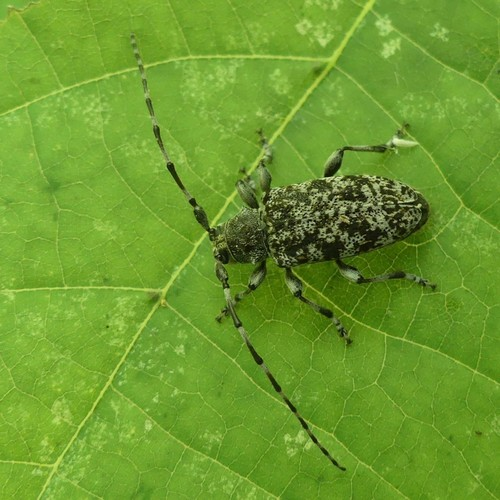

Scientific classification
- Domain: Eukaryota
- Kingdom: Animalia
- Phylum: Arthropoda
- Class: Insecta
- Order: Coleoptera
- Suborder: Polyphaga
- Infraorder: Cucujiformia
- Family: Cerambycidae
- Genus: Oplosia
- Species: O. nubila

Binomial name
- Oplosia nubila (LeConte, 1862)

= Oplosia nubila =

Species of beetle

Oplosia nubila is a species of beetle in the family Cerambycidae. It was described by John Lawrence LeConte in 1862.
