= Neochodaeus =

Scientific classification
- Domain: Eukaryota
- Kingdom: Animalia
- Phylum: Arthropoda
- Class: Insecta
- Order: Coleoptera
- Suborder: Polyphaga
- Infraorder: Scarabaeiformia
- Family: Ochodaeidae
- Genus: Neochodaeus; Nikolayev, 1995

Genus of beetles

Neochodaeus is a genus of sand-loving scarab beetles in the family Ochodaeidae. There are at least four described species in Neochodaeus.

== Species ==
- Neochodaeus frontalis (LeConte, 1863)
- Neochodaeus praesidii (Bates, 1887)
- Neochodaeus repandus (Fall, 1909)
- Neochodaeus striatus (LeConte, 1854)
