= Bostrychopsebium =

Scientific classification
- Kingdom: Animalia
- Phylum: Arthropoda
- Class: Insecta
- Order: Coleoptera
- Suborder: Polyphaga
- Infraorder: Cucujiformia
- Family: Cerambycidae
- Subfamily: Cerambycinae
- Tribe: Psebiini
- Genus: Bostrychopsebium; Quentin & Villiers, 1971

Genus of beetles

Bostrychopsebium is a genus of typical longhorn beetles in the family Cerambycidae. There are at least three described species in Bostrychopsebium, found in Africa and Asia.

== Species ==
These three species belong to the genus Bostrychopsebium:

- Bostrychopsebium erythraeense Quentin & Villiers, 1971 (Eritrea)
- Bostrychopsebium transvaalense Quentin & Villiers, 1971 (South Africa)
- Bostrychopsebium usurpator Holzschuh, 1989 (Sri Lanka)
