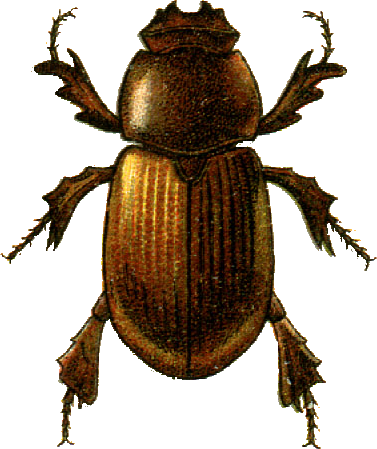
- Codocera ferruginea

Scientific classification
- Domain: Eukaryota
- Kingdom: Animalia
- Phylum: Arthropoda
- Class: Insecta
- Order: Coleoptera
- Suborder: Polyphaga
- Infraorder: Scarabaeiformia
- Family: Ochodaeidae
- Genus: Codocera; Eschscholtz, 1821

Synonyms
- Stomphax Fischer von Waldheim, 1823

= Codocera =

Genus of beetles

Codocera is a genus of sand-loving scarab beetles in the family Ochodaeidae. There are at least three described species in Codocera.

== Species ==
These three species belong to the genus Codocera:

- Codocera ferruginea (Eschscholtz, 1818)
- Codocera gnatho (Fall, 1907)
- Codocera tuberculata Medvedev & Nikolajev, 1972
