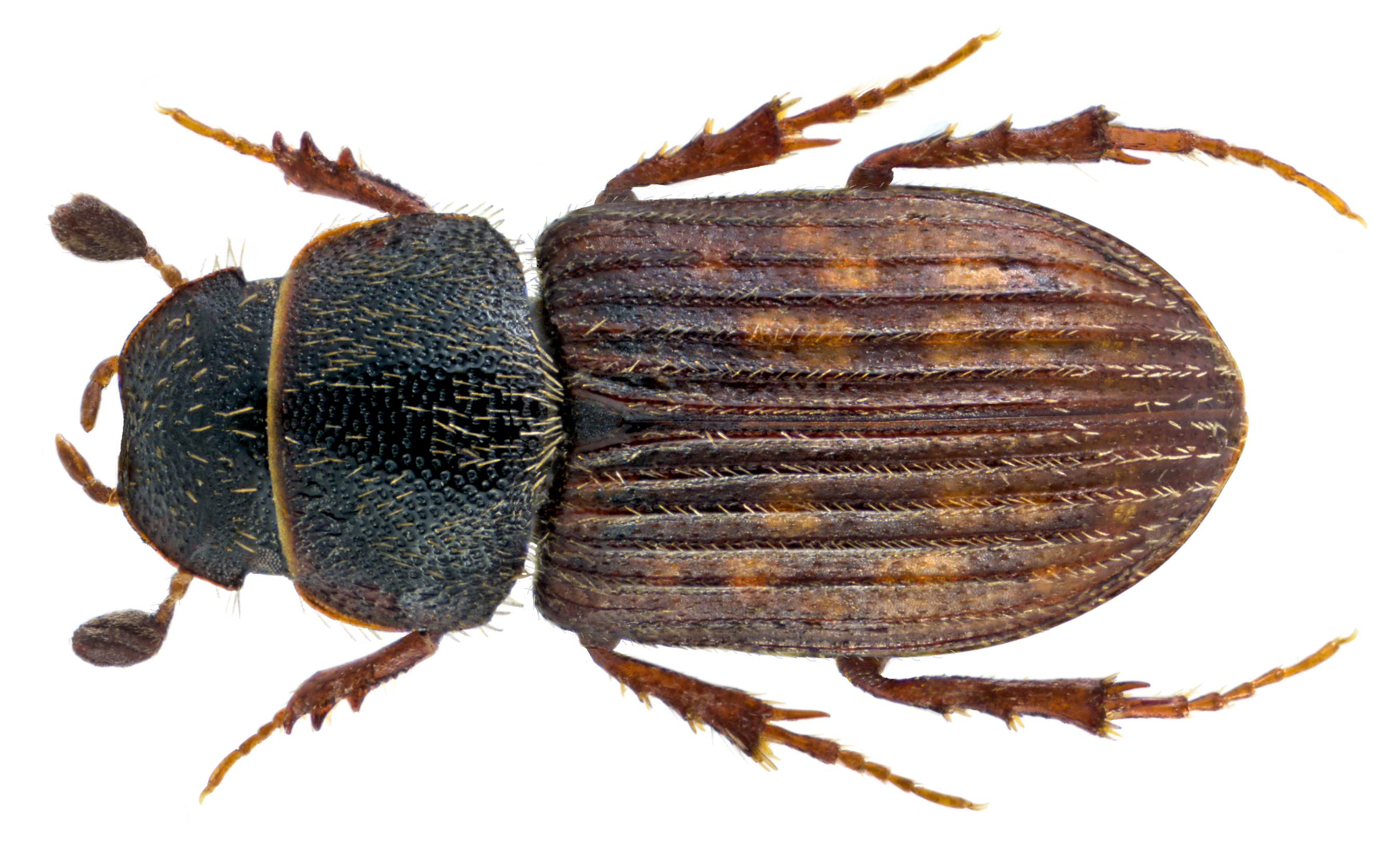

Scientific classification
- Kingdom: Animalia
- Phylum: Arthropoda
- Clade: Pancrustacea
- Class: Insecta
- Order: Coleoptera
- Suborder: Polyphaga
- Infraorder: Scarabaeiformia
- Family: Scarabaeidae
- Genus: Heptaulacus
- Species: H. testudinarius

Binomial name
- Heptaulacus testudinarius (Fabricius, 1775)

Synonyms
- Scarabaeus testudinarius Fabricius, 1775

= Heptaulacus testudinarius =

Species of beetle

Heptaulacus testudinarius is a species of beetle of the family Scarabaeidae. It is found in Armenia, Austria, Belarus, Belgium, Croatia, the Czech Republic, Denmark, Estonia, France, Germany, Great Britain, Hungary, Italy, Kazakhstan, Latvia, Lithuania, the Netherlands, Poland, Portugal, Russia, Slovakia, Slovenia, Spain, Sweden, Switzerland, Ukraine and Uzbekistan.

== Description ==
Adults reach a length of about 3–4.5 mm (0.12–0.18 in). They have an elongate, convex, moderately shiny, yellowish pubescent, blackish body. The elytra are ferrugineous and densely blackish spotted.

== Life history ==
Specimens have been collected in horse dung, but have also been found among rotting plants.
