= La Chapelle-de-Mardore =

- Part of Thizy-les-Bourgs
- Location of La Chapelle-de-Mardore
- Location within France Location within Auvergne-Rhône-Alpes
- Coordinates: 46°03′10″N 4°21′21″E
- Country: France
- Region: Auvergne-Rhône-Alpes
- Department: Rhône
- Arrondissement: Villefranche-sur-Saône
- Commune: Thizy-les-Bourgs
- Area^{1}: 5.79 km^{2} (2.24 sq mi)
- Elevation: 550 m (1,800 ft)
- Highest elevation: 745 m (2,444 ft)
- Lowest elevation: 498 m (1,634 ft)
- Population (2022): 231
  - Density: 39.9/km^{2} (103/sq mi)
- Time zone: UTC+01:00 (CET)
  - Summer (DST): UTC+02:00 (CEST)
- Postal code: 69240
- ^{1} French Land Register data, which excludes lakes, ponds, glaciers > 1 km^{2} (0.386 sq mi or 247 acres) and river estuaries.

La Chapelle-de-Mardore (French pronunciation: [la ʃapɛl də maʁdɔʁ]) is a former commune in the Rhône department in Rhône-Alpes region in eastern France. Its population was 231 in 2022.

On 1 January 2013, La Chapelle-de-Mardore and four other communes merged becoming one commune called Thizy-les-Bourgs.
