= Exocentrus ritae =

Scientific classification
- Kingdom: Animalia
- Phylum: Arthropoda
- Class: Insecta
- Order: Coleoptera
- Suborder: Polyphaga
- Infraorder: Cucujiformia
- Family: Cerambycidae
- Genus: Exocentrus
- Species: E. ritae

Binomial name
- Exocentrus ritae Sama, 1985

Species of beetle

Exocentrus ritae is a species of longhorn beetles of the subfamily Lamiinae. It was described by Sama in 1985, and is endemic to Turkey. The beetles inhabit deciduous trees. They measure 3–5 millimetres (0.12–0.20 in) in length, and can live for approximately 1–2 years.
