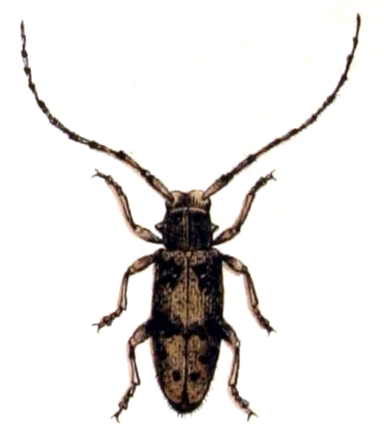

Scientific classification
- Kingdom: Animalia
- Phylum: Arthropoda
- Class: Insecta
- Order: Coleoptera
- Suborder: Polyphaga
- Infraorder: Cucujiformia
- Family: Cerambycidae
- Genus: Exocentrus
- Species: E. lusitanus

Binomial name
- Exocentrus lusitanus (Linnaeus, 1767)

= Exocentrus lusitanus =

Species of beetle

Exocentrus lusitanus is a species of longhorn beetles of the subfamily Lamiinae. It was described by Carl Linnaeus in his 1767 12th edition of Systema Naturae. It is known from Europe and western Russia. The beetles inhabit broadleaf trees, particularly lime trees and sometimes hazels. The larvae feed on dead tree material under bark and in branches and twigs. They measure 3.5–6 millimetres (0.14–0.24 in) in length as adults, and can live for approximately two years.
