= Heptaulacus syrticola =

Scientific classification
- Kingdom: Animalia
- Phylum: Arthropoda
- Clade: Pancrustacea
- Class: Insecta
- Order: Coleoptera
- Suborder: Polyphaga
- Infraorder: Scarabaeiformia
- Family: Scarabaeidae
- Genus: Heptaulacus
- Species: H. syrticola

Binomial name
- Heptaulacus syrticola (Fairmaire, 1882)

Synonyms
- Aphodius (Heptaulacus) syrticola Fairmaire, 1882

Species of beetle

Heptaulacus syrticola is a species of beetle of the family Scarabaeidae. It is found in Algeria, Libya and Tunisia.

== Description ==
Adults reach a length of about 3–4 mm (0.12–0.16 in). They have a moderately convex, oblong-oval body. The head and pronotum are blackish-brown to black, while the elytra are yellowish-brown to light brown, with dark markings. The legs are blackish-brown.
