= Bucolus fourneti =

Scientific classification
- Kingdom: Animalia
- Phylum: Arthropoda
- Class: Insecta
- Order: Coleoptera
- Suborder: Polyphaga
- Infraorder: Cucujiformia
- Family: Coccinellidae
- Genus: Bucolus
- Species: B. fourneti

Binomial name
- Bucolus fourneti Mulsant, 1850

Species of beetle

Bucolus fourneti is a native Australian, small, hairy coccinellid beetle approximately 2.1-4.5 mm in diameter. It was described by Étienne Mulsant in 1850

Due to the persistence of three distinct colour morphs that are somewhat separated geographically, it was thought that it was actually three different species: Bucolous nuytsiae Lea, Bucolus nigripes Lea and Bucolus obscurus Lea. However, Slipinski and Dolambi (2007) have shown that the male genitalia and general external characters remain constant within the different geographical morphs and synonymised the three species to one.

== Morphology ==
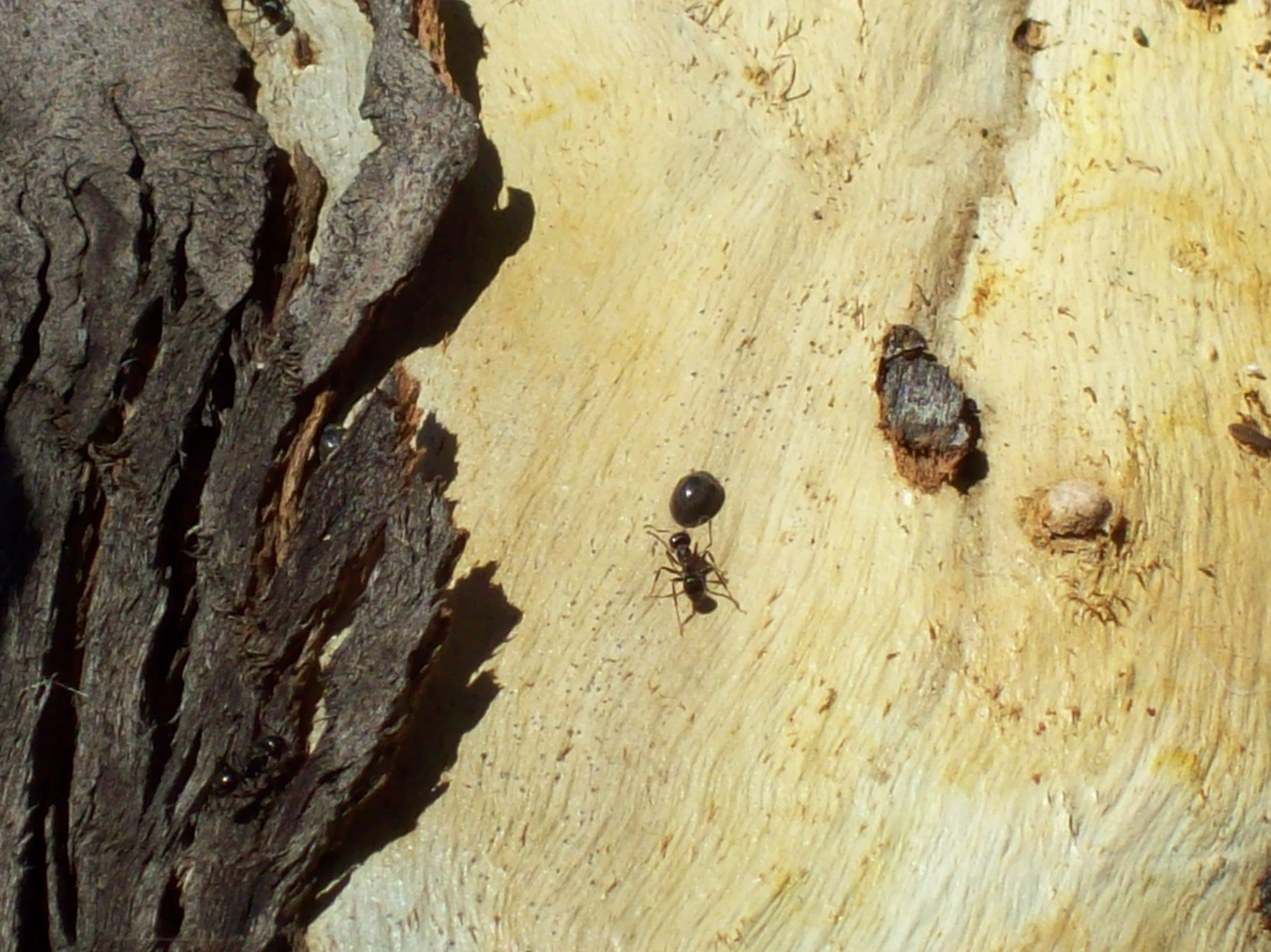

=== Adult ===
This ladybeetle has a typically rounded form and has three geographically separated colour morphs; light brown/grey with a red smudge on the middle of each elytra (wing casing), dark grey with a red smudge on the middle of each elytra, and dark grey with no red smudges or spots.

The head, elytra, legs and underside are entirely covered in small hairs. Though there has been no substantial evidence gathered, it has been preliminarily suggested that the morphology of this species suggests that it is a myrmecophile (tends to live in close proximity to ants/ant-liking) and it may possibly be a myrmecophage (ant eater).

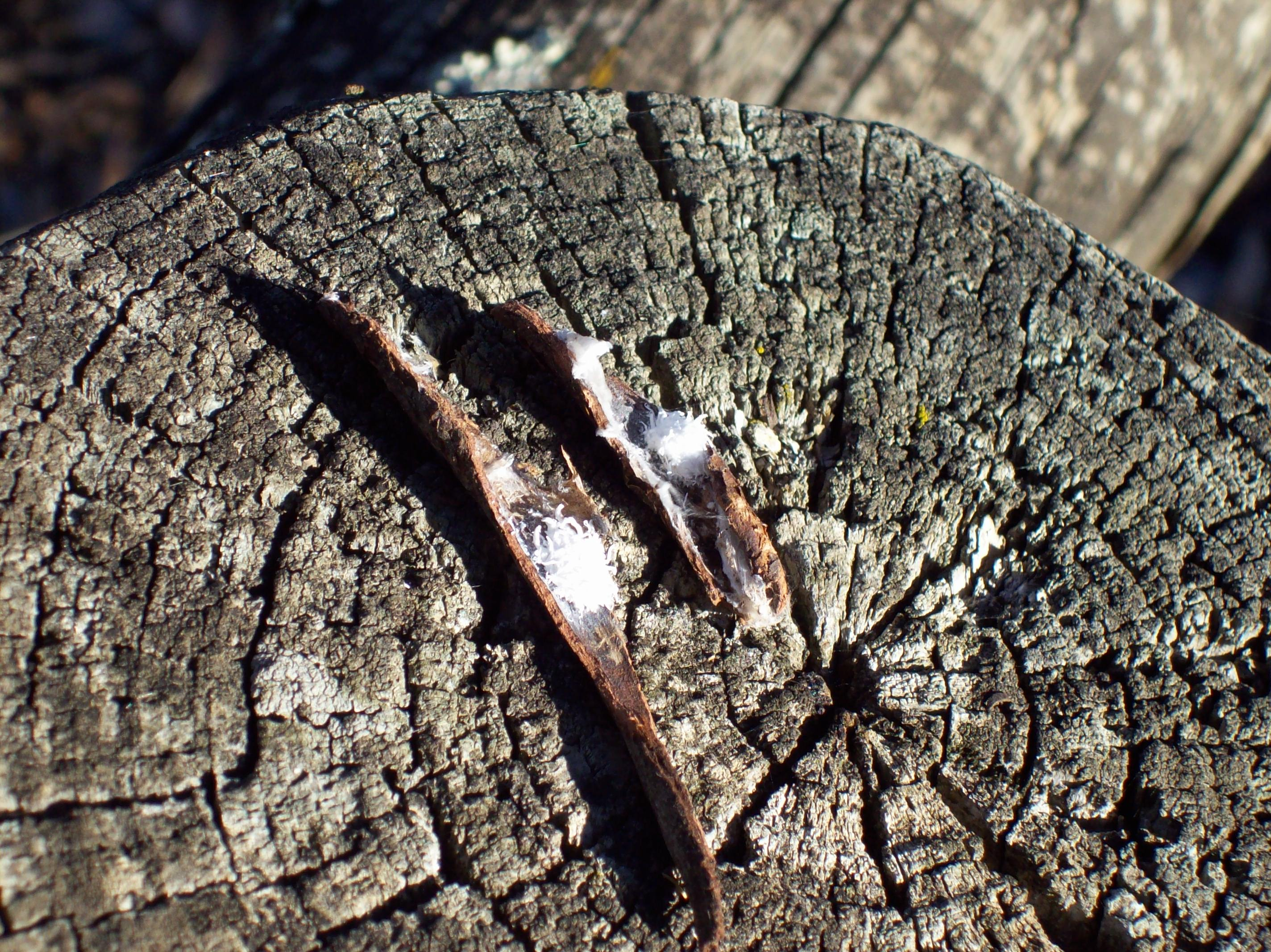

=== Pupae ===
Length 3.1 mm, width 2.0 mm. The pupa is covered in a dense coat of white, waxy filaments that is relatively longer and denser than on the larvae. The filaments themselves are also thicker and longer than those of the larvae, and cover the dorsal surface only.

The pupae are creamy white without any apparent sclerotisation or colour pattern. The pupa is anchored inside of the last larval skin through the urogomphi. The larval exuvia, with the pupa inside, is attached underneath a piece of eucalypt bark. The entire body of the pupa is sparsely covered in a darker brown pubescence that is particularly longer and denser on pronotum. The body is segmented with eleven segments clearly visible: the three thoracic and eight abdominal segments. The body of pupa is broadly elongate with the pronotum flaring towards the mesonotum and the abdomen tapering to the terminal abdominal tergite. There are no spines anywhere on the body.

==== Head ====
The head is pale homogenously sclerotised and sparsely setiferous. The clypeolabrum is rounded and sits as a semicircle protruding down from between the large, prominent eyes; frontal part flat or weakly concave. Antenna is very short, extending to about one fourth of the distance between eye and the widest lateral margin of the pronotum; loose three-segmented club is distinctly visible; club does not have any spinules or setae. Maxillary palps well visible, last segment enlarged. The antennal segments are relatively spherical, and each antenna sits in the ventral groove along the inner margin of the eye. The eyes are approximately one eye-width apart.

==== Thoracic segments ====
The pronotum is distinctly transverse and moderately convex with its lateral sides widely explanate and extending rooflike over head and legs. Its anterior margin is straight, while the posterior one is slightly lobed medially. The elytron is homogenously and sparsely setiferous. The hindwings are glabrous. The legs are short and robust, tucked in close to the body with the forelegs tucked under the head, the midlegs tucked under the forelegs and the hindlegs tucked under the midlegs. The femora and tibiae of all legs are broad and dorso-ventrally flattened.

==== Abdomen ====
The abdomen is widest at the third tergite and curves laterally towards the ventral surface. The terga are sparsely setose with groups of longer and denser setae near the lateral corners; spiracles are not visible externally. Due to the curved abdomen, the single pair of urogomphi cannot be seen dorsally. The urogomphi are entire, unbranched and sit on the apex of the terminal abdominal tergite. They are relatively short, curving slightly inwards towards the ventral surface. The urogomphi end in a rounded club, with the club slightly wider than the stalks. These clubs are darker brown, particularly on the ventral surface, contrasting the rest of the body.

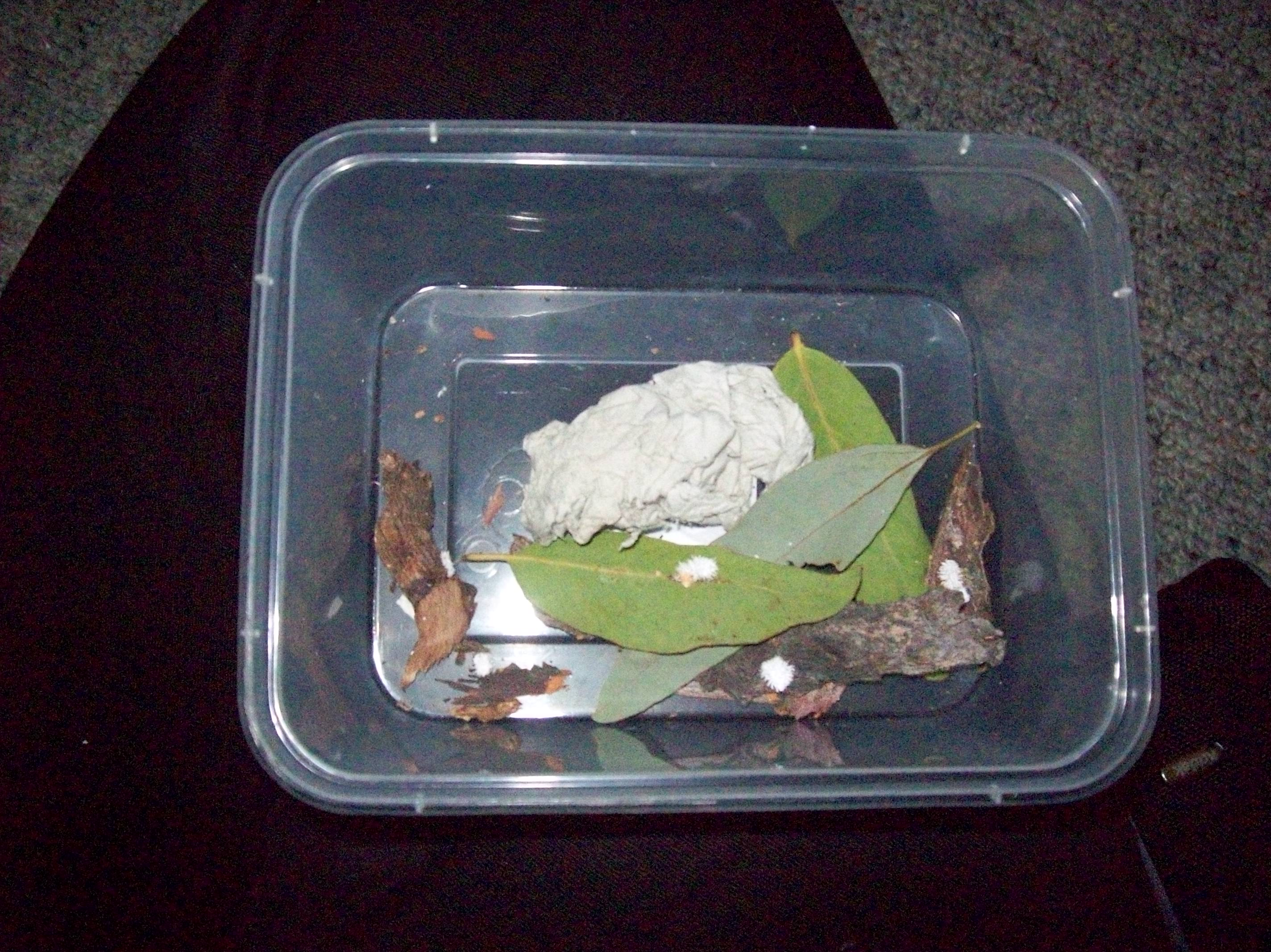
Bucolus fourneti late instar larvae

=== Larvae ===
The final instar larvae can be up to twice as large as the adult, and the second to fourth instars are known to be covered in thick, white waxy filaments.

Length 2–6 mm. When alive the entire dorsal surface is covered by a secretion of very thick, white, waxy filaments, with longer filaments fringing the body margin. The ventral surface is devoid of waxy filaments. The body is broadly ovate and highly dorso-ventrally flat. It is widest at the abdomen and narrows anteriorly and posteriorly. It is soft bodied and the dorsal-ventral body margin is distinctly lobed. The dorsal surfaces are yellowish white with the head and poorly developed thoracic tergal plates distinctly darker. The entire body is sparsely pubescent with longer setae clustered around the margin (on the lobes). Setose strumae, verrucae, unclustered setae and chalazae are present on the dorsal and ventral surfaces. The pubescence is dark brown and relatively straight and apically simple. Three pairs of legs are located on the ventral surface of thoracic segments. The legs can never be seen dorsally and are relatively short.

==== Head ====
The head capsule is darker brown – a contrast to the creamy-white body. The head capsule is transverse with the sides slightly rounded, and it cannot be seen dorsally. The epicranial stem is absent, with the frontal arms arcuate, U-shaped and obsolete anteriorly, with the basal portion of frontal sutures fused. The antennae are very short (0.15 times the head width) and three segmented, joined to the head via a large membrane (allowing the antennae to be withdrawn into the head capsule). The terminal antennomere is highly acute and narrow, approximately 0.33 the width of the pedicel and 0.25 the width of the scape. The scape is annular and much wider than it is long. It is the shortest segment. The pedicel is longer than scape, bearing conical sensorium on the distal surface near the outer rim, and a pair of pre-apical setae on the outer rim. The pedicel is slightly longer than the terminal segment. There are two longish setae projecting up from the pedicel. The antennae can be seen dorsally from the head capsule, but not dorsally from the entire body. The flagellum is dome-shaped with apical seta and several sensilla. The small, black, three stemmata (simple eyes) sit just behind the antennae at either end of the head capsule, wide apart from each other at approximately 10 times the width of the eye apart. The inner cutting edges of mandibles are entire, unserrated and slightly sickle shaped, the apex very acute. The mandibles have a partially membranous lobe on the molar part. They are much less wide than that of the adult, and appear to be more highly sclerotised. This suggests that they are used, unlike the adult of this species, to pierce harder-shelled insect prey. The maxillary palps are three segmented and almost half as narrow as the antennae. The terminal segment is slightly narrower than the base, and the mid segment is slightly larger than the terminal segment and slightly narrower than the basal segment. The palpifer is distinct and incomplete. The two basal segments are wider than they are long whereas the terminal segment is longer than it is wide. The mala is broadly rounded apically and the stylus, with pedunculate seta, is present. The single pair of labial palps are very close together at a distance 0.3 times the width of the basal segment and sit on the front of the head in the lateral middle, directly between the maxillary palps. The labial and maxillary palps sit between and entirely below the antennae. The basal segment of the labium is very short and annular with the distal segment transverse and longer than the first segment. The palpifer is sclerotised and fused with the opposite palpifer to form a complete ring. The submentum is entirely membranous.

==== Pronotum ====
The dorsal surface of the first body segment (pronotum) has a darker brown, patchy colouration at the apex. The crown of the pronotum has a longer, denser fringe of setae than anywhere else on the body. The setae on the pronotum can be clustered or not. The pronotum is transverse and arcuates anteriorly so that it projects over the head. The dorsal plates are indistinct and are not clearly separated medially. The mesonota and metanota are transverse with rounded lateral margins that have lightly sclerotised plates. The tergal surfaces are without distinct processes and have two transverse rows of short setae and three clusters of long and short setae laterally. The pleural region has distinct multisetose struma.

==== Legs ====
The legs are moderately long at approximately 2 times the length of the head capsule. The tibiotarsus of the foreleg is 0.8 times the length of the head capsule. All six legs are sparsely pubescent, covered in short setae. The setae on the tibiae are significant longer and denser than all other leg pubescence. The trochanter and tarsi are highly reduced and unapparent in all legs. Furthermore, all femora are the longest segments of each leg. All tarsi are adorned with a single, highly sclerotised, and sickle-shaped claw with margins entire and unserrated. Each claw has a weak basal tooth. The forelegs are half the length of the second and third legs, and the foreleg has a much wider tibia. Both apices of all tibiae and femora are dark brown due to sclerotisation. This sclerotisation makes a golden-brown outline of a circle around the "knee" of the larva, where the tibiae and femora meet, the tibiae of the forelegs are highly reduced and much wider than they are long.

==== Abdomen ====
There are nine abdominal segments in total. The first eight are transverse with each tergite displaying two rows of short setae, two clusters of setae and weakly developed lateral strumae bearing several chalazae; the pleural area has several setae. Tergite IX is semicircular with the dorsal and lateral surfaces distinctly setiferous. All abdominal segments, as with all body parts except for the legs and head capsule, are creamy to yellowy white.

== Range ==
Whilst relatively little is known about Bucolus fourneti, it is known that this species is a ladybeetle native to Australia and has been found under loose Eucalyptus bark, on Acacia and in leaf litter. Preliminary data suggests that this species is found Australia wide, though is locally sparse in population density.

Since the species was discovered in 1850, Bucolus fourneti has been collected from 73 locations across Australia for various Australian state insect collections (data from Slipinski & Dolambi, 2007). The collection points for these specimens show a wide distribution for Bucolus fourneti, and this suggests that this species may be a habitat generalist. However, questions remain regarding the habitat requirements for the species, including the significance of water, altitude and the abundance of specific plant and animal families/species.

== Diet ==
Both adult and larval Bucolus fourneti display typical ant-defensive morphologies with respect to their hairy and waxy bodies. They have been observed in the field by Slipinski (2007) to be living nearby ant trails on eucalypt trees and in the lab the larvae were seen grabbing on to ants. It is unknown if this action reflects the larva eating the ant, or merely attacking the ant for an alternative reason (for example: stress, self-defence, territoriality).

Collection data suggests that this species may be eating Acacia blossoms, and other ant-ladybeetle studies suggest that this species may be eating hemipterans (Volkl, 1995; Volkl & Vohland, 1996; Sloggett et al., 1998; Takizawa & Yasuda, 2006; Suzuki & Ide, 2007).

== Microhabitat ==
Microhabitat features are important to the survival of coccinellids. The selection of specific microhabitat qualities within a heterogeneous environment can maximize the fitness of a ladybeetle by affecting the growth rate, rate of feeding and the avoidance of inter- and intra-specific predation (Lucas et al., 2000; Ohashi et al., 2005). As Bucolus fourneti can be found in such environmental extremes (as indicated by their large range), it is possible that the microhabitat choices for this species are particularly important for thermo- and hydro- regulation.

In 2007 during a microhabitat survey, Bucolus fourneti were only found co-existing on Eucalyptus blakelyi trees with the ant species Notoncus gilberti. It was observed that the larvae and pupae in particular prefer to live in the crevices and under loose bark in trees, and the adults moved about exposed above the bark during daylight hours.
