= Pseudochodaeus =

Scientific classification
- Domain: Eukaryota
- Kingdom: Animalia
- Phylum: Arthropoda
- Class: Insecta
- Order: Coleoptera
- Suborder: Polyphaga
- Infraorder: Scarabaeiformia
- Family: Ochodaeidae
- Genus: Pseudochodaeus; Carlson & Ritcher, 1974

Genus of beetles

Pseudochodaeus is a genus of sand-loving scarab beetles in the family Ochodaeidae. There is at least one described species in Pseudochodaeus, P. estriatus.
