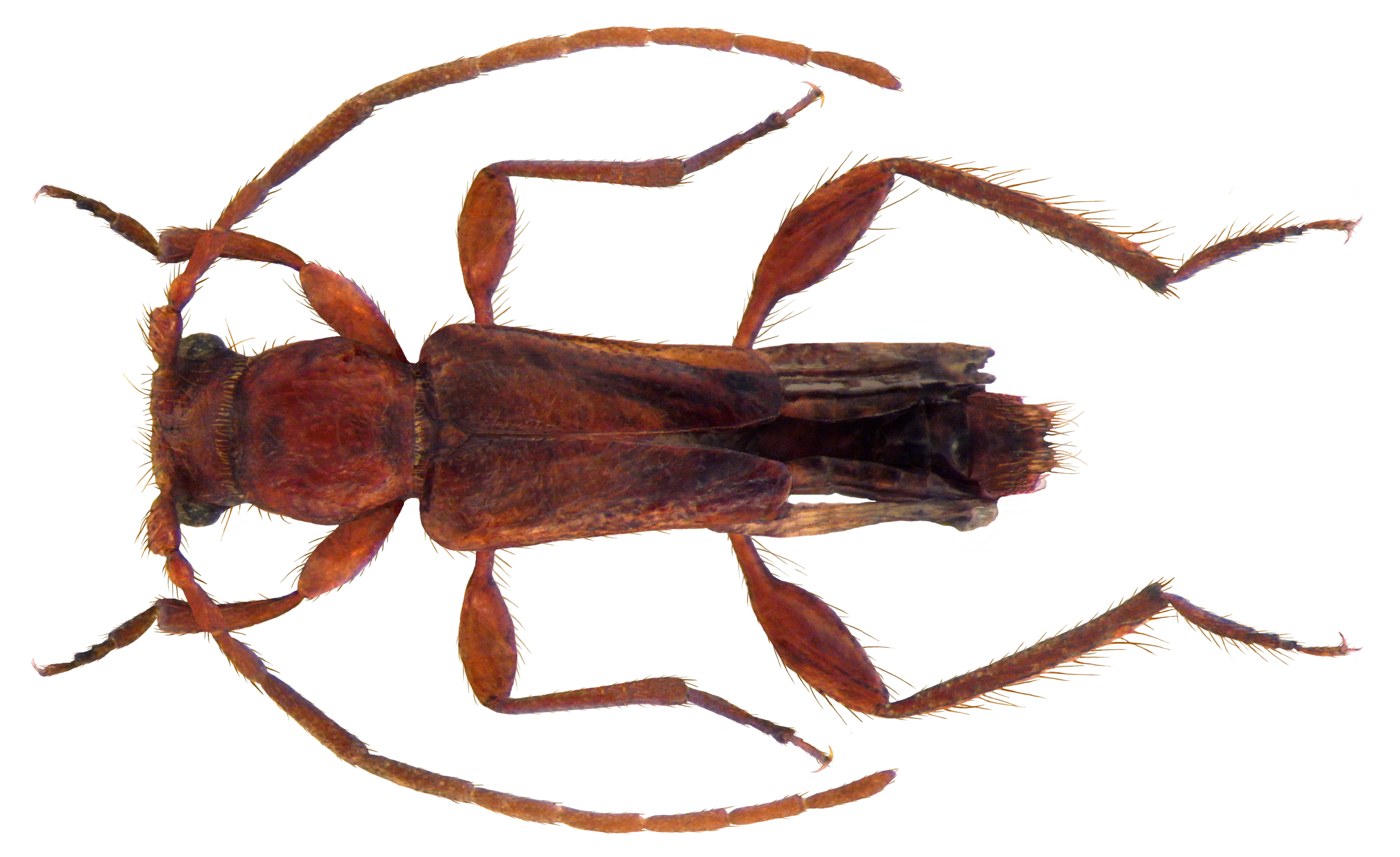
- Nathrius brevipennis

Scientific classification
- Kingdom: Animalia
- Phylum: Arthropoda
- Class: Insecta
- Order: Coleoptera
- Suborder: Polyphaga
- Infraorder: Cucujiformia
- Family: Cerambycidae
- Tribe: Psebiini
- Genus: Nathrius; Brèthes, 1916

= Nathrius =

Genus of beetles

Nathrius is a genus of beetles in the subfamily Cerambycinae.

== Species ==
- Nathrius berlandi (Villiers, 1946)
- Nathrius brevipennis (Mulsant, 1839)
- Nathrius cypericus Sláma & Berger, 2006
