= Hovorea =

Scientific classification
- Kingdom: Animalia
- Phylum: Arthropoda
- Class: Insecta
- Order: Coleoptera
- Suborder: Polyphaga
- Infraorder: Cucujiformia
- Family: Cerambycidae
- Genus: Hovorea
- Species: H. chica

Binomial name
- Hovorea chica Chemsak & Noguera, 1993

Genus of beetles

Hovorea is a monotypic genus of beetle in the family Cerambycidae containing the single species Hovorea chica. It was described by Chemsak and Noguera in 1993.
