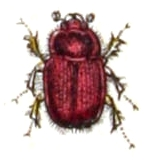

Scientific classification
- Domain: Eukaryota
- Kingdom: Animalia
- Phylum: Arthropoda
- Class: Insecta
- Order: Coleoptera
- Suborder: Polyphaga
- Infraorder: Scarabaeiformia
- Family: Ochodaeidae
- Genus: Ochodaeus; Dejean, 1821

= Ochodaeus =

Genus of insects

Ochodaeus is a genus of beetles belonging to the family Ochodaeidae.

The species of this genus are found in Europe, Africa and Northern America.

Species:

- Ochodaeus adsequa Kolbe, 1907
- Ochodaeus alius Scholtz & Evans, 1987
- Ochodaeus asahinai Kurosawa, 1968
