= Bourg-de-Thizy =

- Part of Thizy-les-Bourgs
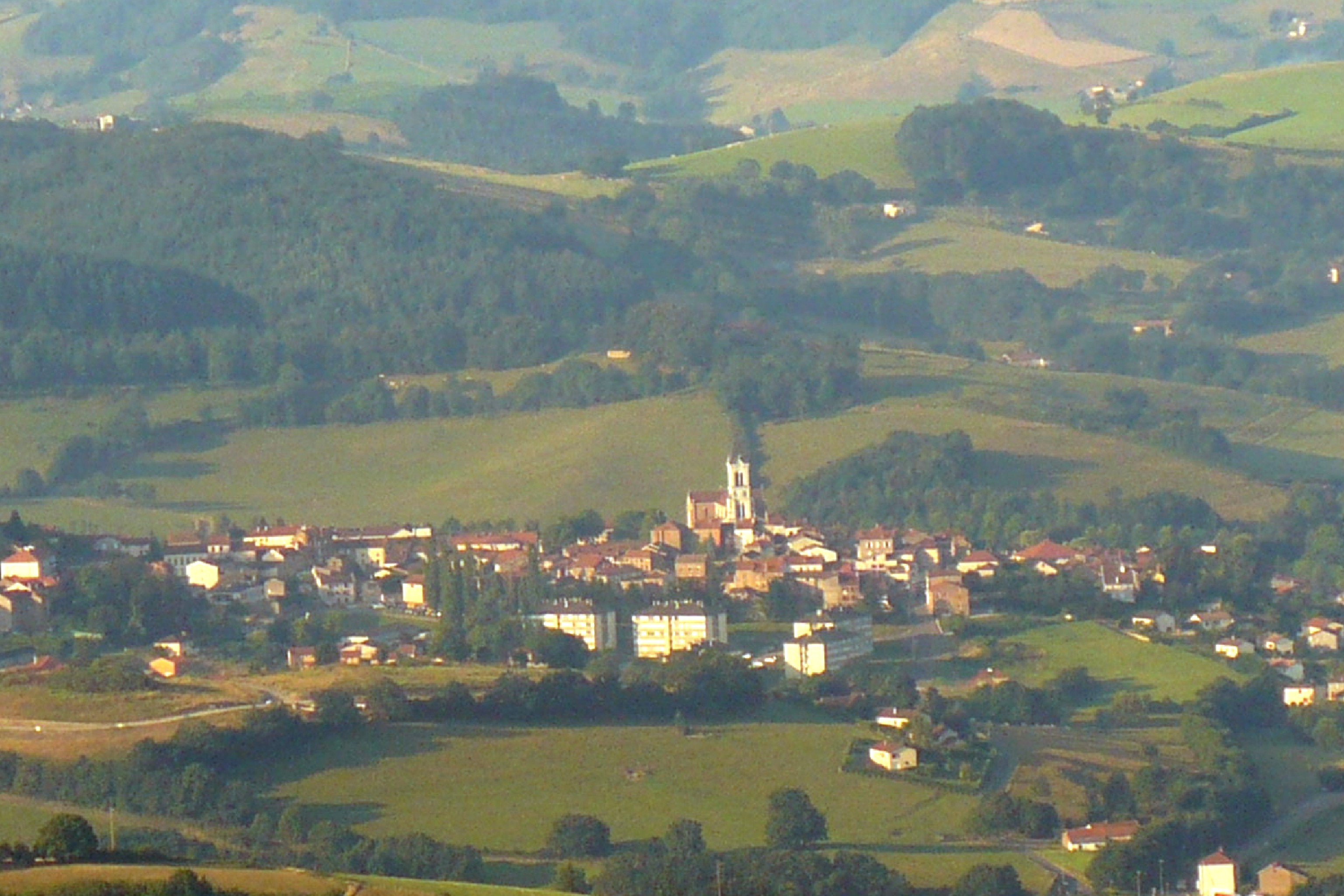
- Location of Bourg-de-Thizy
- Location within France Location within Auvergne-Rhône-Alpes
- Coordinates: 46°02′06″N 4°17′59″E
- Country: France
- Region: Auvergne-Rhône-Alpes
- Department: Rhône
- Arrondissement: Villefranche-sur-Saône
- Canton: Thizy-les-Bourgs
- Commune: Thizy-les-Bourgs
- Area^{1}: 14.49 km^{2} (5.59 sq mi)
- Elevation: 461 m (1,512 ft)
- Highest elevation: 570 m (1,870 ft)
- Lowest elevation: 365 m (1,198 ft)
- Population (2022): 2,362
  - Density: 163.0/km^{2} (422.2/sq mi)
- Time zone: UTC+01:00 (CET)
  - Summer (DST): UTC+02:00 (CEST)
- Postal code: 69240
- ^{1} French Land Register data, which excludes lakes, ponds, glaciers > 1 km^{2} (0.386 sq mi or 247 acres) and river estuaries.

Bourg-de-Thizy (French pronunciation: [buʁ də tizi]) is a former commune of the Rhône department in Rhône-Alpes region in eastern France.

On 1 January 2013, Bourg-de-Thizy and four other communes merged becoming one commune called Thizy-les-Bourgs.

== Twin towns ==
Bourg-de-Thizy is twinned with the small East Yorkshire town of Hessle in the United Kingdom.
