= Thizy, Rhône =

Thizy
- Part of Thizy-les-Bourgs
- Location of Thizy
- Location within France Location within Auvergne-Rhône-Alpes
- Coordinates: 46°02′00″N 4°18′44″E
- Country: France
- Region: Auvergne-Rhône-Alpes
- Department: Rhône
- Arrondissement: Villefranche-sur-Saône
- Canton: Thizy-les-Bourgs
- Commune: Thizy-les-Bourgs
- Area^{1}: 1.94 km^{2} (0.75 sq mi)
- Elevation: 563 m (1,847 ft)
- Highest elevation: 627 m (2,057 ft)
- Lowest elevation: 408 m (1,339 ft)
- Population (2022): 2,140
  - Density: 1,100/km^{2} (2,860/sq mi)
- Time zone: UTC+01:00 (CET)
  - Summer (DST): UTC+02:00 (CEST)
- Postal code: 69240
- ^{1} French Land Register data, which excludes lakes, ponds, glaciers > 1 km^{2} (0.386 sq mi or 247 acres) and river estuaries.

Thizy (French pronunciation: [tizi]) is a former commune in the Rhône department in Rhône-Alpes region in eastern France.

On 1 January 2013, Thizy and four other communes merged becoming one commune called Thizy-les-Bourgs.
