= Dodecocerus =

Scientific classification
- Kingdom: Animalia
- Phylum: Arthropoda
- Class: Insecta
- Order: Coleoptera
- Suborder: Polyphaga
- Infraorder: Cucujiformia
- Family: Cerambycidae
- Genus: Dodecocerus
- Species: D. poirieri

Binomial name
- Dodecocerus poirieri Dalens & Touroult, 2008

Genus of beetles

Dodecocerus is a monotypic genus in the family Cerambycidae containing the single species Dodecocerus poirieri. It was described by Dalens and Touroult in 2008.
