= Valéry Mayet =

French entomologist

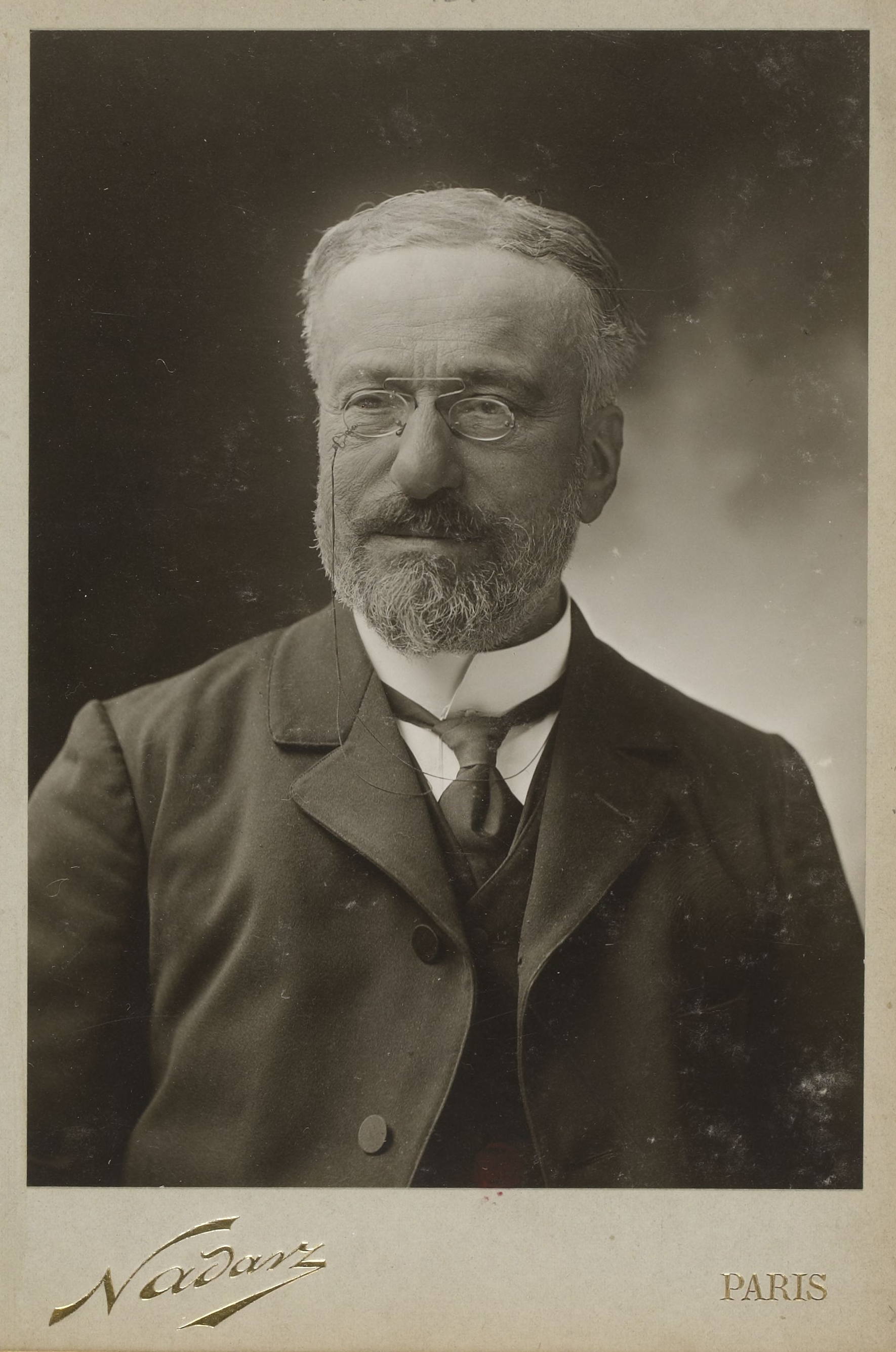

Valéry Mayet (2 January 1839, in Lyon – 1909) was a French entomologist. He was professor of zoology in Montpellier at the French National School of Agriculture (École nationale d'agriculture).

== Publications ==
- Sur l'oeuf du Phylloxera, 1881 (On the eggs of phylloxera).
- Résultats des traitements effectués en Suisse en vue de la destruction du Phylloxera, 1881 (Results on treatments used in Switzerland for destruction of phylloxera).
- Voyage dans le sud de la Tunisie. 1886 (Travel into southern Tunisia).
- Les Insectes de la vigne. Montpellier: Camille Coulet, 1890.
- The phylloxera of the vine, by Valéry Mayet; translated for the Board of Viticultural Commissioners, 1894.
- La Cochenille des vignes du Chili. 1895 (The cochineal of Chilean vineyards).
- Essai de géographie zoologique de l'Hérault. 1898 (Zoological geography of Herault).
- Catalogue raisonné des reptiles et batraciens de la Tunisie. 1903 (Catalogue raisonné of reptiles and amphibians of Tunisia.
