= Frondipedia =

Scientific classification
- Kingdom: Animalia
- Phylum: Arthropoda
- Class: Insecta
- Order: Coleoptera
- Suborder: Polyphaga
- Infraorder: Cucujiformia
- Family: Cerambycidae
- Genus: Frondipedia
- Species: F. charma

Binomial name
- Frondipedia charma Martins & Napp, 1984

Genus of beetles

Frondipedia is a monotypic genus of beetle in the family Cerambycidae containing the single species Frondipedia charma. It was described by Martins and Napp in 1984. The species is native to Brazil.
