= Francisque Guillebeau =

French entomologist

- Born: 1821; Lyon, France
- Died: 1897 (aged 75–76)
- Known for: Specializing in Coleoptera; taxonomic authority of numerous beetle species; circumscriber of genera Tinodemus, Podocesus, Nesiotus, Entomocnemus, Ochrodemus
- Notable work: Catalogue des Coléoptères du département de l'Ain, Révision du genre Orchesia Latreille
- Scientific career
- Fields: Entomology
- Institutions: Le Plantay (mayor); collector in France, Switzerland, Austria
- Author abbrev. (zoology): Guillebeau

Francisque Guillebeau (1821, Lyon – 1897) was a French entomologist, specializing in Coleoptera.

A farmer by trade, he also spent twelve years serving as a justice of the peace. From 1858 to 1874 he was mayor in the town of Le Plantay.

In 1850 he became a corresponding member of the Société linnéenne de Lyon. In Lyon, he had as influences; entomologists Antoine Foudras and Étienne Mulsant, with whom he published several papers on Coleoptera. For many years he abandoned entomological work, resuming these activities later on in life as he conducted collection excursions in France, Switzerland and Austria.

His Coleoptera collection was acquired by Paul de Fréminville (1859-1939), who subsequently made it part of his personal insect collection. Later it was transferred to the Musée de Brou in Bourg-en-Bresse, and since 1997 it has been housed at the Muséum de Lyon.

Guillebeau is the taxonomic authority of numerous species of beetles, as well as the circumscriber of several genera; e.g. Tinodemus, Podocesus, Nesiotus, Entomocnemus and Ochrodemus. He was a member of the Société entomologique de France.

== Publications in entomology ==
- 1855, Description d'une nouvelle espèce d'Uloma. Ann. Soc. linn. Lyon, 2 : 421-426. with Mulsant.
- 1855. Notes pour servir à l'histoire des Lagries. Ann. Soc. linn. Lyon, 2 : 65-74. with Mulsant.
- 1855, Description de quelques espèces d'Elatérides. Ann. Soc. linn. Lyon, 2 : 17-32. with Mulsant.
- 1855, Description de deux Coléoptères nouveaux ou peu connus. Ann. Soc. linn. Lyon, 2 : 157-160. with Mulsant.
- 1855, Notes pour servir à l'histoire des Ténébrions. Ann. Soc. linn. Lyon, 2 : 9-13. with Mulsant.
- 1855, Notes pour servir à l'histoire des Ténébrions. Ann. Soc. linn. Lyon, 2 : 9-13. with Mulsant.
- 1856, Description d'une nouvelle espèce de Coléoptère de la tribu des Longicornes. Ann. Soc. linn. Lyon, 3 : 103-107. with Mulsant.
- 1856, Description de quelques Elatérides nouveaux ou peu connus. Ann. Soc. linn. Lyon, 3 : 60-99. with Mulsant.
- 1856, Description de la larve du Ludius ferrugineus. Ann. Soc. linn. Lyon, 3 : 190-192. with Mulsant.
- 1857, Description d'une espèce nouvelle du genre Orchesia de la tribu des Barbiplapes. Ann. Soc. linn. Lyon, 4 : 414-416. with Mulsant.
- 1885, Descriptions de quelques nouvelles espèces de Coléoptères. L'échange. Revue linnéenne, 1 (6) : 2-3.
- 1885, Descriptions de quelques nouvelles espèces de Coléoptères.. L'échange. Revue linnéenne, 1 (7) : 2-3.
- 1887, 1888 - Révision du genre Orchesia Latreille. L'échange. Revue linnéenne, 13p.
- 1889, 1890, 1891, 1892, 1893, 1894, 1895, Catalogue des Coléoptères du département de l'Ain. L'échange. Revue linnéenne, 69 p.
- 1891, Note sur quelques Catops nouveaux. L'Échange. Revue linnéenne, 7 (83) : 116.
- 1892, Description d'un Phalacrus nouveau. L'Échange. Revue linnéenne, 8 (86) : 20.
- 1894. Descriptions de quelques especes de la famille de Phalacridae de la Collection de M. Antoine Grouvelle. Annales Societe Entomologique de France 63: 275-310.
- 1894. Description de nouveaux psélaphides d'Algérie. L’Échange, Revue Linnéenne, 10, 46–47.
- 1896. Descriptions de Phalacridae recueillis par M. Ch. Alluaud dans le Nord de Madagascar, en 1893 [Col:]. Bulletin de la Société Entomologique de France 1893: 296–299.
