= Marnand, Rhône =

Marnand
- Part of Thizy-les-Bourgs
- Location of Marnand
- Location within France Location within Auvergne-Rhône-Alpes
- Coordinates: 46°02′10″N 4°19′47″E
- Country: France
- Region: Auvergne-Rhône-Alpes
- Department: Rhône
- Arrondissement: Villefranche-sur-Saône
- Commune: Thizy-les-Bourgs
- Area^{1}: 8.75 km^{2} (3.38 sq mi)
- Elevation: 650 m (2,130 ft)
- Highest elevation: 720 m (2,360 ft)
- Lowest elevation: 420 m (1,380 ft)
- Population (2022): 589
  - Density: 67.3/km^{2} (174/sq mi)
- Time zone: UTC+01:00 (CET)
  - Summer (DST): UTC+02:00 (CEST)
- Postal code: 69240
- ^{1} French Land Register data, which excludes lakes, ponds, glaciers > 1 km^{2} (0.386 sq mi or 247 acres) and river estuaries.

Marnand (French pronunciation: [maʁnɑ̃]) is a former commune in the Rhône department in Rhône-Alpes region in eastern France.

On 1 January 2013, Marnand and four other communes merged becoming one commune called Thizy-les-Bourgs.
