= Nathriobrium =

Scientific classification
- Kingdom: Animalia
- Phylum: Arthropoda
- Class: Insecta
- Order: Coleoptera
- Suborder: Polyphaga
- Infraorder: Cucujiformia
- Family: Cerambycidae
- Genus: Nathriobrium
- Species: N. methioides

Binomial name
- Nathriobrium methioides Hovore, 1980

Genus of beetles

Nathriobrium is a monotypic genus of beetle in the family Cerambycidae containing the single species Nathriobrium methioides. It was described by Hovore in 1980.
