= Étienne Mulsant =

French entomologist and ornithologist

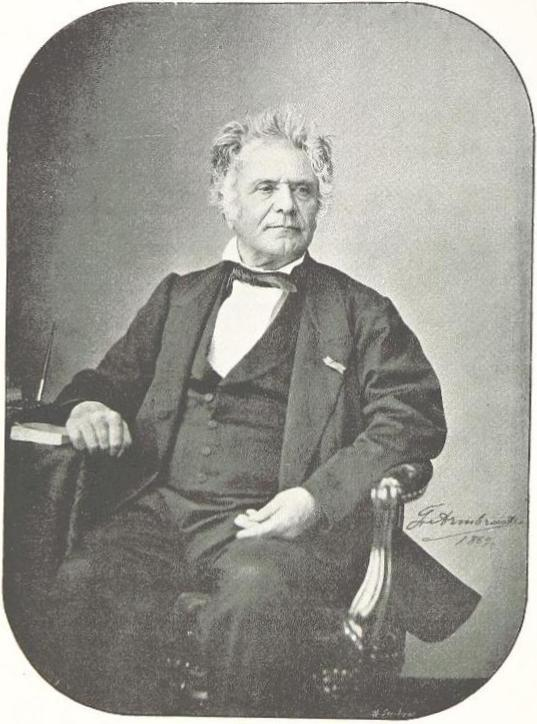
- Etienne Mulsant
- Born: 2 March 1797; Marnand, Rhône, France
- Died: 4 November 1880 (aged 83); Lyon
- Scientific career
- Fields: entomology, ornithology

Martial Étienne Mulsant (French pronunciation: [maʁsjal etjɛn mylsɑ̃]; 2 March 1797, Marnand, Rhône – 4 November 1880) was a French entomologist and ornithologist.

== Biography ==
Initially employed in commerce, Mulsant wrote Lettres à Julie sur l'entomologie, suivies d'une description méthodique de la plus grande partie des insectes de France, ornées de planches... ("Letters to Julie on entomology, followed by a methodical description of the greatest part of the insects of France with, decorated plates..."), dedicated to his future wife, Julie Ronchivole.

In 1817, he became mayor of Saint-Jean-la-Bussière, where his parents had property. In 1827 he became, following his father and grandfather, a justice of the peace. He settled in Lyon in 1830 and in 1839, he obtained a post of assistant librarian and then, in 1843, a post of professor of natural history in a college; a post he occupied until 1873.

In 1840, he published Histoire naturelle des Coléoptères de France, ("Natural History of the Coleoptera of France") with various other entomologists : Antoine Casimir Marguerite Eugène Foudras (1783–1859) and Claudius Rey (1817–1895), his former pupil. He also had as pupils Francisque Guillebeau (1821–1897) and Valéry Mayet (1839–1909). His 1846 and 1850 monographs on the subject formed the basis for much of modern ladybug taxonomy.

With Jean Baptist Édouard Verreaux (1810–1868), he wrote Histoire naturelle des punaises de France, ("Natural History of the bugs of France") between 1865 and 1879. He also published school texts on zoology and geology. He was, for many years, president of the Société linnéenne de Lyon. He was also interested in birds, publishing several studies and taking part in the work of the commission on hunting small birds. In 1868, he wrote Lettres à Julie sur l'ornithologie ("Letters to Julie on ornithology"), a splendid work on the oiseaux-mouches de 1874 à 1877.

A monumental research work was published by Etienne Mulsant, titled Histoire Naturelle des Oiseaux-Mouches, ou Colibris constituant la famille des Trochilïdes (published in 1874–77). It contained 4 text volumes, with a separate Atlas of colored plates in imperial quarto size (lg.4to) by Lyon-Geneve-Bale. The Atlas is illustrated with 120 exceptional, fine, large hand-colored lithograph plates of the known species of hummingbirds. Copies of this illustrated Atlas on hummingbirds are extremely rare.

The "hummingbird of Mulsant", Acestrura mulsanti (now Chaetocercus mulsant), was named for him by Jules Bourcier in 1842. The ladybug genus Mulsantina is also named in his honor.

== See also ==
- Bucolus fourneti - described by Mulsant in 1850.
