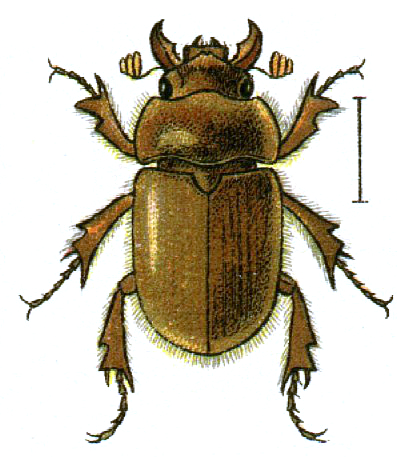
- Codocera ferruginea

Scientific classification
- Kingdom: Animalia
- Phylum: Arthropoda
- Clade: Pancrustacea
- Class: Insecta
- Order: Coleoptera
- Suborder: Polyphaga
- Infraorder: Scarabaeiformia
- Superfamily: Scarabaeoidea
- Family: Ochodaeidae; Mulsant & Rey, 1871

Genera
- Chaetocanthus Péringuey, 1901; Codocera Eschscholtz, 1818; Cucochodaeus Paulsen, 2007; Enodognathus Benderitter, 1921; Gauchodaeus Paulsen, 2012; Mioochodaeus Nikolajev, 1995; Namibiotalpa Scholtz & Evans, 1987; Neochodaeus Nikolayev, 1995; Notochodaeus Nikolajev, 2005; Ochodaeus Dejean, 1821; Odontochodaeus Paulian, 1976; Parochodaeus Nikolayev, 1995; Pseudochodaeus Carlson & Richter, 1974; Synochodaeus Kolbe, 1907; Xenochodaeus Paulsen, 2007

= Ochodaeidae =

Family of beetles

Ochodaeidae, also known as the sand-loving scarab beetles, is a small family of scarabaeiform beetles occurring in many parts of the world.

These beetles are small, ranging from 3–10 millimetres (0.12–0.39 in). Their bodies are elongate and convex, with black and brown colors including yellowish- and reddish-brown shades.

As of 2012, the biology and habits of Ochodaeidae beetles is still mostly unknown. Most types have been collected in sandy areas at night, while some of their species are active during the day.

== Taxonomy ==
Ochodaeidae beetles belong to the infraorder Scarabaeiformia, which contains only one superfamily, the Scarabaeoidea. The most striking feature of the Scarabaeoidea are the ends of their antennae, that are divided into several lamellae, thus resembling a fan. Another distinguishing feature are their legs, that possess teeth and are adapted for digging.

Ochodaeidae is divided into two subfamilies containing five tribes and 15 genera:

- Subfamily Ochodaeinae Mulsant & Rey, 1871

- Tribe Enodognathini Scholtz, 1988

Enodognathus Benderitter, 1921
Odontochodaeus Paulian, 1976

- Tribe Ochodaeini Mulsant & Rey, 1871

Codocera Eschscholtz, 1818
Cucochodaeus Paulsen, 2007
Neochodaeus Nikolayev, 1995
Notochodaeus Nikolajev, 2005
Ochodaeus Dejean, 1821
Parochodaeus Nikolayev, 1995
Xenochodaeus Paulsen, 2007

- Subfamily Chaetocanthinae Scholtz in Scholtz, D'Hotman, Evans & Nel, 1988

- Tribe Chaetocanthini Scholtz in Scholtz, D'Hotman, Evans & Nel, 1988

Chaetocanthus Péringuey, 1901
Mioochodaeus Nikolajev, 1995
Namibiotalpa Scholtz & Evans, 1987

- Tribe Pseudochodaeini Scholtz, 1988

Pseudochodaeus Carlson & Richter, 1974

- Tribe Synochodaeini Scholtz, 1988

Synochodaeus Kolbe, 1907
Gauchodaeus Paulsen, 2012

== Literature about Ochodaeidae ==
- Smith, A.B.T. 2006: A review of the family-group names for the superfamily Scarabaeoidea (Coleoptera) with corrections to nomenclature and a current classification. Coleopterists Society monograph, 5: 144–204.; doi:10.1649/0010-065X(2006)60[144:AROTFN]2.0.CO;2 / PDF on the web site of the Zoological Institute of St. Petersburg: PDF
- Bezděk, A.; Hájek, J. 2009: Catalogue of type specimens of beetles (Coleoptera) deposited in the National Museum, Prague, Czech Republic. Scarabaeoidea: Bolboceratidae, Geotrupidae, Glaphyridae, Hybosoridae, Ochodaeidae and Trogidae. Acta Entomologica Musei Nationalis Pragae, 49: 297–332. PDF
- Nikolajev, G.V. 2009: Ochodaeidae species of the Palaearctic's Asia. Euroasian entomological journal, 8(2): 205–211. [not seen]
- Nikolajev, G.V.; Ren, D. 2010: The oldest fossil Ochodaeidae (Coleoptera: Scarabaeoidea) from the Middle Jurassic of China. Zootaxa, 2553: 65–68. Preview
- Scholtz, C.H. 1988: Phylogeny and systematics of the Ochodaeidae (Insecta: Coleoptera: Scarabaeoidea). Journal of the Entomological Society of Southern Africa, 51: 207–240. ISSN 0013-8789
- I. Lobl, & A. Smetana 2006: Catalogue of Palearctic Coleoptera. Vol. 3, Apollo Books, Stenstrup, Denmark, ISBN 87-88757-59-5, p. 95
