= Toxotoma lepida =

Scientific classification
- Kingdom: Animalia
- Phylum: Arthropoda
- Clade: Pancrustacea
- Class: Insecta
- Order: Coleoptera
- Suborder: Polyphaga
- Infraorder: Cucujiformia
- Family: Coccinellidae
- Genus: Toxotoma
- Species: T. lepida

Binomial name
- Toxotoma lepida (Erichson, 1847)

Synonyms
- Epilachna lepida Erichson, 1847; Epilachna imperfecta Crotch, 1874; Solanophila lepida var. mendosa Weise, 1899

Species of beetle

Toxotoma lepida is a species of beetle of the family Coccinellidae. It is found in Peru.

== Description ==
Adults reach a length of about 7.78–10.63 mm. Adults are similar to Toxotoma azurea, but the elytron has dark violet or brassy luster and the spots are pale yellow.
