= Toxotoma gentilis =

Scientific classification
- Kingdom: Animalia
- Phylum: Arthropoda
- Clade: Pancrustacea
- Class: Insecta
- Order: Coleoptera
- Suborder: Polyphaga
- Infraorder: Cucujiformia
- Family: Coccinellidae
- Genus: Toxotoma
- Species: T. gentilis

Binomial name
- Toxotoma gentilis Gordon, 1975

Species of beetle

Toxotoma gentilis is a species of beetle of the family Coccinellidae. It is found in Bolivia.

== Description ==
Adults reach a length of about 7.41 mm. Adults are similar to Toxotoma pilifera.
