= Toxotoma imitator =

Scientific classification
- Kingdom: Animalia
- Phylum: Arthropoda
- Clade: Pancrustacea
- Class: Insecta
- Order: Coleoptera
- Suborder: Polyphaga
- Infraorder: Cucujiformia
- Family: Coccinellidae
- Genus: Toxotoma
- Species: T. imitator

Binomial name
- Toxotoma imitator Gordon, 1975

Species of beetle

Toxotoma imitator is a species of beetle of the family Coccinellidae. It is found in Peru.

== Description ==
Adults reach a length of about 7.33 – 8.00 mm. Adults are similar to Toxotoma cuzcoensis, but dark greenish blue, both the spots on the elytron are smaller.
