= Toxotoma paracuta =

Scientific classification
- Kingdom: Animalia
- Phylum: Arthropoda
- Clade: Pancrustacea
- Class: Insecta
- Order: Coleoptera
- Suborder: Polyphaga
- Infraorder: Cucujiformia
- Family: Coccinellidae
- Genus: Toxotoma
- Species: T. paracuta

Binomial name
- Toxotoma paracuta (Gordon, 1975)

Synonyms
- Epilachna paracuta Gordon, 1975

Species of beetle

Toxotoma paracuta is a species of beetle of the family Coccinellidae. It is found in Colombia.

== Description ==
Adults reach a length of about 6.75–6.95 mm. Adults are dark brown. The anterolateral angle of the pronotum is pale and the elytron is black with the same colour pattern as Epilachna aculata.
