= Toxotoma opulenta =

Scientific classification
- Kingdom: Animalia
- Phylum: Arthropoda
- Clade: Pancrustacea
- Class: Insecta
- Order: Coleoptera
- Suborder: Polyphaga
- Infraorder: Cucujiformia
- Family: Coccinellidae
- Genus: Toxotoma
- Species: T. opulenta

Binomial name
- Toxotoma opulenta (Weise, 1902)

Synonyms
- Solanophila opulenta Weise, 1902

Species of beetle

Toxotoma opulenta is a species of beetle of the family Coccinellidae. It is found in Peru.

== Description ==
Adults reach a length of about 5.65 – 6.38 mm. Adults are similar to Toxotoma pilifera, but the orange spot on the elytron is smaller.
