= Epilachna manni =

Scientific classification
- Kingdom: Animalia
- Phylum: Arthropoda
- Clade: Pancrustacea
- Class: Insecta
- Order: Coleoptera
- Suborder: Polyphaga
- Infraorder: Cucujiformia
- Family: Coccinellidae
- Genus: Epilachna
- Species: E. manni

Binomial name
- Epilachna manni Gordon, 1975

Species of beetle

Epilachna manni is a species of beetle of the family Coccinellidae. It is found in Bolivia.

== Description ==
Adults reach a length of about 5.50–6.75 mm. Adults are similar to Toxotoma zischkai, but the yellow spots on the elytron are reduced and the anterior spot is larger than the posterior spot.
