= Toxotoma fenestrata =

Scientific classification
- Kingdom: Animalia
- Phylum: Arthropoda
- Clade: Pancrustacea
- Class: Insecta
- Order: Coleoptera
- Suborder: Polyphaga
- Infraorder: Cucujiformia
- Family: Coccinellidae
- Genus: Toxotoma
- Species: T. fenestrata

Binomial name
- Toxotoma fenestrata (Erichson, 1847)

Synonyms
- Epilachna fenestrata Erichson, 1847

Species of beetle

Toxotoma fenestrata is a species of beetle of the family Coccinellidae. It is found in Peru and Bolivia.

== Description ==
Adults reach a length of about 5.05–6.30 mm. Adults are black and the elytron has the same colour pattern as Epilachna simulans.
