= Toxotoma andicola =

Scientific classification
- Kingdom: Animalia
- Phylum: Arthropoda
- Clade: Pancrustacea
- Class: Insecta
- Order: Coleoptera
- Suborder: Polyphaga
- Infraorder: Cucujiformia
- Family: Coccinellidae
- Genus: Toxotoma
- Species: T. andicola

Binomial name
- Toxotoma andicola Weise, 1900

Species of beetle

Toxotoma andicola is a species of beetle of the family Coccinellidae. It is found in Peru.

== Description ==
Adults reach a length of about 7.94 mm. Adults are similar to Toxotoma tridentata.
