= Toxotoma hiekei =

Scientific classification
- Kingdom: Animalia
- Phylum: Arthropoda
- Clade: Pancrustacea
- Class: Insecta
- Order: Coleoptera
- Suborder: Polyphaga
- Infraorder: Cucujiformia
- Family: Coccinellidae
- Genus: Toxotoma
- Species: T. hiekei

Binomial name
- Toxotoma hiekei Gordon, 1975

Species of beetle

Toxotoma hiekei is a species of beetle of the family Coccinellidae. It is found in Bolivia.

== Description ==
Adults reach a length of about 8.31 – 8.44 mm. Adults are similar to Toxotoma pilifera.
