= Toxotoma satipensis =

Scientific classification
- Kingdom: Animalia
- Phylum: Arthropoda
- Clade: Pancrustacea
- Class: Insecta
- Order: Coleoptera
- Suborder: Polyphaga
- Infraorder: Cucujiformia
- Family: Coccinellidae
- Genus: Toxotoma
- Species: T. satipensis

Binomial name
- Toxotoma satipensis (Gordon, 1975)

Synonyms
- Epilachna satipensis Gordon, 1975

Species of beetle

Toxotoma satipensis is a species of beetle of the family Coccinellidae. It is found in Peru.

== Description ==
Adults reach a length of about 7-7.80 mm. Adults are similar to Epilachna woytkowskii, but the elytron is black with two orange spots.
