= Toxotoma geometrica =

Scientific classification
- Kingdom: Animalia
- Phylum: Arthropoda
- Clade: Pancrustacea
- Class: Insecta
- Order: Coleoptera
- Suborder: Polyphaga
- Infraorder: Cucujiformia
- Family: Coccinellidae
- Genus: Toxotoma
- Species: T. geometrica

Binomial name
- Toxotoma geometrica (Weise, 1900)

Synonyms
- Solanophila geometrica Weise, 1900

Species of beetle

Toxotoma geometrica is a species of beetle of the family Coccinellidae. It is found in Peru.

== Description ==
Adults reach a length of about 4.85–5.66 mm. Adults are dark brown. The anterolateral margin of the pronotum is yellow and the elytron is dark yellow with a black margin and two black vittae.
