= Toxotoma taeniola =

Scientific classification
- Kingdom: Animalia
- Phylum: Arthropoda
- Clade: Pancrustacea
- Class: Insecta
- Order: Coleoptera
- Suborder: Polyphaga
- Infraorder: Cucujiformia
- Family: Coccinellidae
- Genus: Toxotoma
- Species: T. taeniola

Binomial name
- Toxotoma taeniola (Gordon, 1975)

Synonyms
- Epilachna taeniola Gordon, 1975

Species of beetle

Toxotoma taeniola is a species of beetle of the family Coccinellidae. It is found in Colombia and Ecuador.

== Description ==
Adults reach a length of about 7.66–8.43 mm. Adults are black. The anterolateral angle of the pronotum is yellow and the elytron is black with two yellow spots.
