= Toxotoma flavocirculus =

Scientific classification
- Kingdom: Animalia
- Phylum: Arthropoda
- Clade: Pancrustacea
- Class: Insecta
- Order: Coleoptera
- Suborder: Polyphaga
- Infraorder: Cucujiformia
- Family: Coccinellidae
- Genus: Toxotoma
- Species: T. flavocirculus

Binomial name
- Toxotoma flavocirculus (González, 2015)

Synonyms
- Epilachna flavocirculus González, 2015

Species of beetle

Toxotoma flavocirculus is a species of beetle of the family Coccinellidae. It is found in Ecuador.

== Description ==
Adults reach a length of about 7.5 mm. The elytron head, pronotum and elytron are black. The elytron has two round yellow spots.
