= Toxotoma tetartea =

Scientific classification
- Kingdom: Animalia
- Phylum: Arthropoda
- Clade: Pancrustacea
- Class: Insecta
- Order: Coleoptera
- Suborder: Polyphaga
- Infraorder: Cucujiformia
- Family: Coccinellidae
- Genus: Toxotoma
- Species: T. tetartea

Binomial name
- Toxotoma tetartea (Gordon, 1975)

Synonyms
- Epilachna tetartea Gordon, 1975

Species of beetle

Toxotoma tetartea is a species of beetle of the family Coccinellidae. It is found in Ecuador.

== Description ==
Adults reach a length of about 8.10–10 mm. Adults are greenish black. The elytron is greenish black with two yellow bands.
