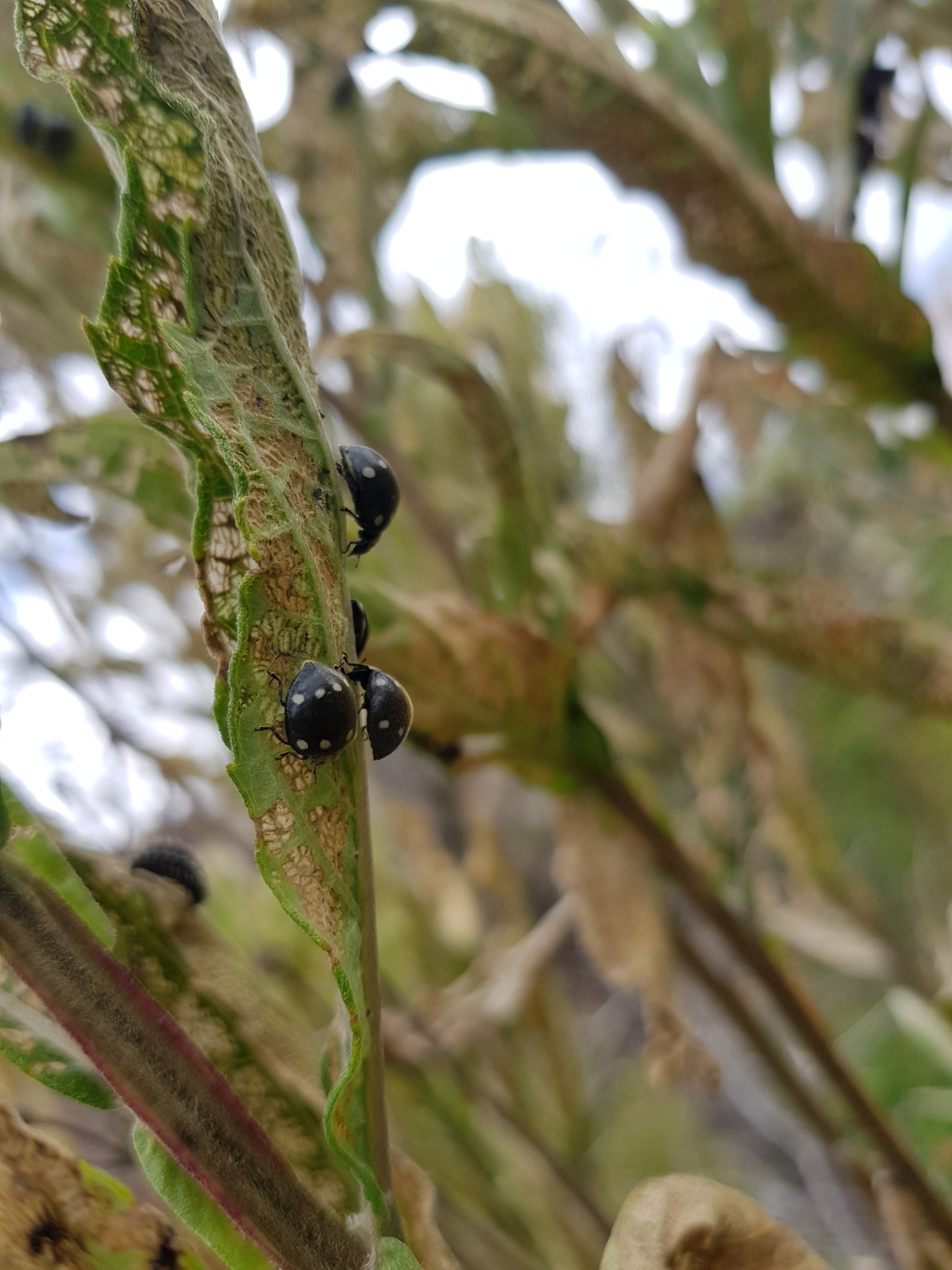

Scientific classification
- Kingdom: Animalia
- Phylum: Arthropoda
- Clade: Pancrustacea
- Class: Insecta
- Order: Coleoptera
- Suborder: Polyphaga
- Infraorder: Cucujiformia
- Family: Coccinellidae
- Genus: Toxotoma
- Species: T. patricia

Binomial name
- Toxotoma patricia (Mulsant, 1850)

Synonyms
- Epilachna patricia Mulsant, 1850; Epilachna archidonae Crotch, 1874; Epilachna banghaasi Weise, 1895

= Toxotoma patricia =

Species of beetle

Toxotoma patricia is a species of beetle of the family Coccinellidae. It is found in Argentina, Peru and Bolivia.

== Description ==
Adults reach a length of about 5.95–7.28 mm. Adults are black. The elytron is bluish black with four yellow spots.
