= Toxotoma nunenmacheri =

Scientific classification
- Kingdom: Animalia
- Phylum: Arthropoda
- Clade: Pancrustacea
- Class: Insecta
- Order: Coleoptera
- Suborder: Polyphaga
- Infraorder: Cucujiformia
- Family: Coccinellidae
- Genus: Toxotoma
- Species: T. nunenmacheri

Binomial name
- Toxotoma nunenmacheri Gordon, 1975

Species of beetle

Toxotoma nunenmacheri is a species of beetle of the family Coccinellidae. It is found in Peru.

== Description ==
Adults reach a length of about 8.8 mm. Adults are black. The elytron is dark blue with a greenish tinge and two yellow spots.
