= Toxotoma fuscopilosa =

Scientific classification
- Kingdom: Animalia
- Phylum: Arthropoda
- Clade: Pancrustacea
- Class: Insecta
- Order: Coleoptera
- Suborder: Polyphaga
- Infraorder: Cucujiformia
- Family: Coccinellidae
- Genus: Toxotoma
- Species: T. fuscopilosa

Binomial name
- Toxotoma fuscopilosa (Weise, 1902)

Synonyms
- Solanophila fuscopilosa Weise, 1902; Epilachna fuscopilosa

Species of beetle

Toxotoma fuscopilosa is a species of beetle of the family Coccinellidae. It is found in Peru and Ecuador.

== Description ==
Adults reach a length of about 7-8.30 mm. Adults are black. The elytron is black with several yellow spots.
