= Toxotoma dubia =

Scientific classification
- Kingdom: Animalia
- Phylum: Arthropoda
- Clade: Pancrustacea
- Class: Insecta
- Order: Coleoptera
- Suborder: Polyphaga
- Infraorder: Cucujiformia
- Family: Coccinellidae
- Genus: Toxotoma
- Species: T. dubia

Binomial name
- Toxotoma dubia (Crotch, 1874)

Synonyms
- Epilachna dubia Crotch, 1874

Species of beetle

Toxotoma dubia is a species of beetle of the family Coccinellidae. It is found in Ecuador.

== Description ==
Adults reach a length of about 4.76–5.71 mm. Adults are dark brown. The anterolateral angle of the pronotum is yellow and the elytron is yellow with a black border.
