= Toxotoma opacula =

Scientific classification
- Kingdom: Animalia
- Phylum: Arthropoda
- Clade: Pancrustacea
- Class: Insecta
- Order: Coleoptera
- Suborder: Polyphaga
- Infraorder: Cucujiformia
- Family: Coccinellidae
- Genus: Toxotoma
- Species: T. opacula

Binomial name
- Toxotoma opacula (Crotch, 1874)

Synonyms
- Epilachna opacula Crotch, 1874

Species of beetle

Toxotoma opacula is a species of beetle of the family Coccinellidae. It is found in Ecuador.

== Description ==
Adults reach a length of about 8.30 – 9.96 mm. Adults are black. The elytron is bluish black with two small yellowish orange spots.
