= Toxotoma flavofasciata =

Scientific classification
- Kingdom: Animalia
- Phylum: Arthropoda
- Clade: Pancrustacea
- Class: Insecta
- Order: Coleoptera
- Suborder: Polyphaga
- Infraorder: Cucujiformia
- Family: Coccinellidae
- Genus: Toxotoma
- Species: T. flavofasciata

Binomial name
- Toxotoma flavofasciata (Laporte, 1840)

Synonyms
- Coccinella flavofasciata Laporte, 1840; Coccinella humeralis Latreille, 1809; Coccinella proteus Guérin-Méneville, 1844; Epilachna variabilis Crotch, 1874; Epilachna inconstans Crotch, 1874; Solanophila passiva Weise, 1900

Species of beetle

Toxotoma flavofasciata is a species of beetle of the family Coccinellidae. It is found in Colombia, Peru, Ecuador and Venezuela.

== Description ==
Adults reach a length of about 6.71 – 10.53 mm. Adults are black. The elytron is bluish black with two transverse yellow bands.
