= Toxotoma ostensoides =

Scientific classification
- Kingdom: Animalia
- Phylum: Arthropoda
- Clade: Pancrustacea
- Class: Insecta
- Order: Coleoptera
- Suborder: Polyphaga
- Infraorder: Cucujiformia
- Family: Coccinellidae
- Genus: Toxotoma
- Species: T. ostensoides

Binomial name
- Toxotoma ostensoides (Gordon, 1975)

Synonyms
- Epilachna ostensoides Gordon, 1975

Species of beetle

Toxotoma ostensoides is a species of beetle of the family Coccinellidae. It is found in Ecuador and Peru.

== Description ==
Adults reach a length of about 5.58–6.80 mm. Adults are dark brown. The anterolateral margin of the pronotum is yellow and the elytron is yellow with a black border, a median vitta and a transverse band.
