= Toxotoma convergens =

Scientific classification
- Kingdom: Animalia
- Phylum: Arthropoda
- Clade: Pancrustacea
- Class: Insecta
- Order: Coleoptera
- Suborder: Polyphaga
- Infraorder: Cucujiformia
- Family: Coccinellidae
- Genus: Toxotoma
- Species: T. convergens

Binomial name
- Toxotoma convergens (Crotch, 1874)

Synonyms
- Epilachna convergens Crotch, 1874

Species of beetle

Toxotoma convergens is a species of beetle of the family Coccinellidae. It is found in Peru and Ecuador.

== Description ==
Adults reach a length of about 6.72–7.70 mm. Adults are black. The elytron is yellow with two yellow bands.
