= Toxotoma aureola =

Scientific classification
- Kingdom: Animalia
- Phylum: Arthropoda
- Clade: Pancrustacea
- Class: Insecta
- Order: Coleoptera
- Suborder: Polyphaga
- Infraorder: Cucujiformia
- Family: Coccinellidae
- Genus: Toxotoma
- Species: T. aureola

Binomial name
- Toxotoma aureola (Gordon, 1975)

Synonyms
- Epilachna aureola Gordon, 1975

Species of beetle

Toxotoma aureola is a species of beetle of the family Coccinellidae. It is found in Peru and Ecuador.

== Description ==
Adults reach a length of about 8.23 mm. Adults are black. The elytron is greenish black with two yellow vittae.
