= Toxotoma aguascalientes =

Scientific classification
- Kingdom: Animalia
- Phylum: Arthropoda
- Clade: Pancrustacea
- Class: Insecta
- Order: Coleoptera
- Suborder: Polyphaga
- Infraorder: Cucujiformia
- Family: Coccinellidae
- Genus: Toxotoma
- Species: T. aguascalientes

Binomial name
- Toxotoma aguascalientes González & Větrovec, 2021

Species of beetle

Toxotoma aguascalientes is a species of beetle of the family Coccinellidae. It is found in Peru (Cusco).

== Description ==
Adults reach a length of about 6.5–7 mm (0.26–0.28 in). The head is black, while the antennae are mostly yellow. The pronotum is black, with a yellow border at the anterior angles. The scutellum and elytra are black, the latter with two yellow spots on the disc. The ventral surface is mostly black and the legs are black. The pubescence is white.

== Etymology ==
The species is named after the collection locality, Aguas Calientes, in the Department of Cusco, Peru.
