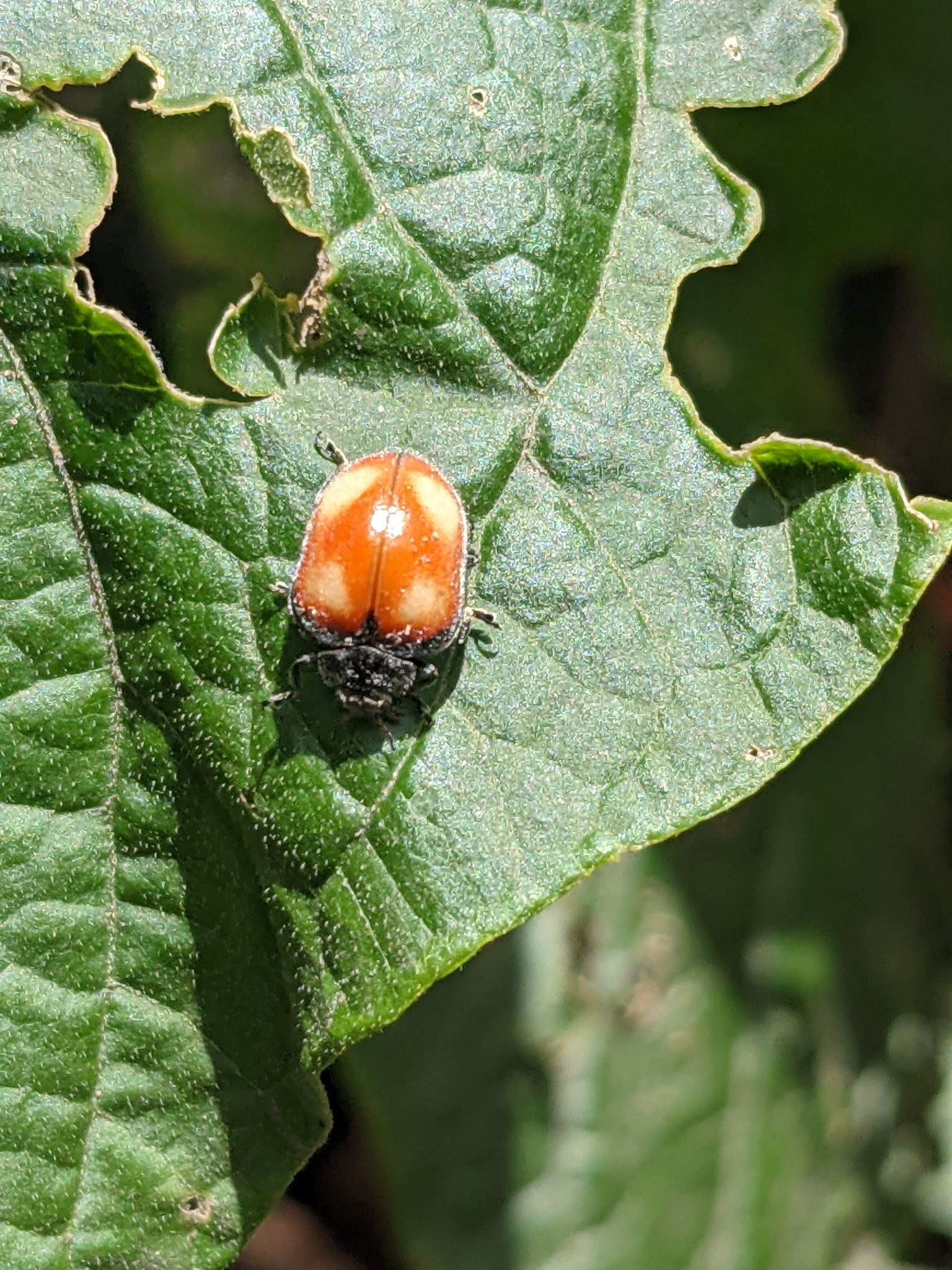

Scientific classification
- Kingdom: Animalia
- Phylum: Arthropoda
- Clade: Pancrustacea
- Class: Insecta
- Order: Coleoptera
- Suborder: Polyphaga
- Infraorder: Cucujiformia
- Family: Coccinellidae
- Genus: Toxotoma
- Species: T. dorsigera

Binomial name
- Toxotoma dorsigera (Erichson, 1847)

Synonyms
- Epilachna dorsigera Erichson, 1847

= Toxotoma dorsigera =

Species of beetle

Toxotoma dorsigera is a species of beetle of the family Coccinellidae. It is found in Peru.

== Description ==
Adults reach a length of about 8.24–10.47 mm. Adults are black. The elytron is brownish yellow with bluish black lateral and basal margins.
