= Toxotoma persimilis =

Scientific classification
- Kingdom: Animalia
- Phylum: Arthropoda
- Clade: Pancrustacea
- Class: Insecta
- Order: Coleoptera
- Suborder: Polyphaga
- Infraorder: Cucujiformia
- Family: Coccinellidae
- Genus: Toxotoma
- Species: T. persimilis

Binomial name
- Toxotoma persimilis (Crotch, 1874)

Synonyms
- Epilachna persimilis Crotch, 1874

Species of beetle

Toxotoma persimilis is a species of beetle of the family Coccinellidae. It is found in Peru.

== Description ==
Adults reach a length of about 5-6.95 mm. Adults are black. The elytron is black with four yellow spots.
