= Toxotoma v-pallidum =

Scientific classification
- Kingdom: Animalia
- Phylum: Arthropoda
- Clade: Pancrustacea
- Class: Insecta
- Order: Coleoptera
- Suborder: Polyphaga
- Infraorder: Cucujiformia
- Family: Coccinellidae
- Genus: Toxotoma
- Species: T. v-pallidum

Binomial name
- Toxotoma v-pallidum (Blanchard, 1846)

Synonyms
- Epilachna v-pallidum Blanchard, 1846

Species of beetle

Toxotoma v-pallidum is a species of beetle of the family Coccinellidae. It is found in Bolivia and Peru.

== Description ==
Adults reach a length of about 8.50–10 mm. Adults are black. The elytron is bluish black with four yellow spots.

== Subspecies ==
- Toxotoma v-pallidum v-pallidum (Bolivia, Peru)
- Toxotoma v-pallidum angulata Gordon, 1975 (Peru)
