= Toxotoma venezuelae =

Scientific classification
- Kingdom: Animalia
- Phylum: Arthropoda
- Clade: Pancrustacea
- Class: Insecta
- Order: Coleoptera
- Suborder: Polyphaga
- Infraorder: Cucujiformia
- Family: Coccinellidae
- Genus: Toxotoma
- Species: T. venezuelae

Binomial name
- Toxotoma venezuelae González & Větrovec, 2021

Species of beetle

Toxotoma venezuelae is a species of beetle of the family Coccinellidae. It is found in Venezuela.

== Description ==
Adults reach a length of about 6.6–7 mm (0.26–0.28 in). The head is black, while the antennae are mostly yellow. The pronotum is black, with the anterior half of the lateral borders and anterior angles light yellow. The scutellum and elytra are black, the latter with a blue dorsal luster. The ventral surface is mostly black and the abdomen and legs are also black. The pubescence is whitish.

== Etymology ==
The species is named after Venezuela, where the holotype was collected.
