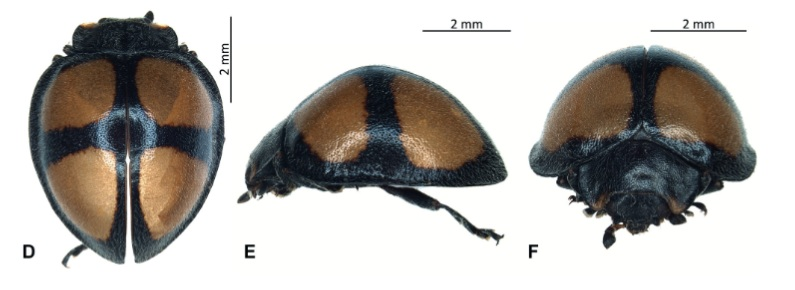

Scientific classification
- Kingdom: Animalia
- Phylum: Arthropoda
- Clade: Pancrustacea
- Class: Insecta
- Order: Coleoptera
- Suborder: Polyphaga
- Infraorder: Cucujiformia
- Family: Coccinellidae
- Genus: Toxotoma
- Species: T. gonzalezi

Binomial name
- Toxotoma gonzalezi Szawaryn & Czerwiński, 2022

= Toxotoma gonzalezi =

Species of beetle

Toxotoma gonzalezi is a species of beetle of the family Coccinellidae. It is found in Ecuador.

== Description ==
Adults reach a length of about 5.80 mm. The elytron is black with two large yellow spots and the pronotum is covered with punctures of single size, while the elytra have punctures in two sizes, irregularly arranged.

== Etymology ==
This species is dedicated to the colleague of the authors and expert of Neotropical Coccinellidae Guillermo González (Santiago, Chile).
