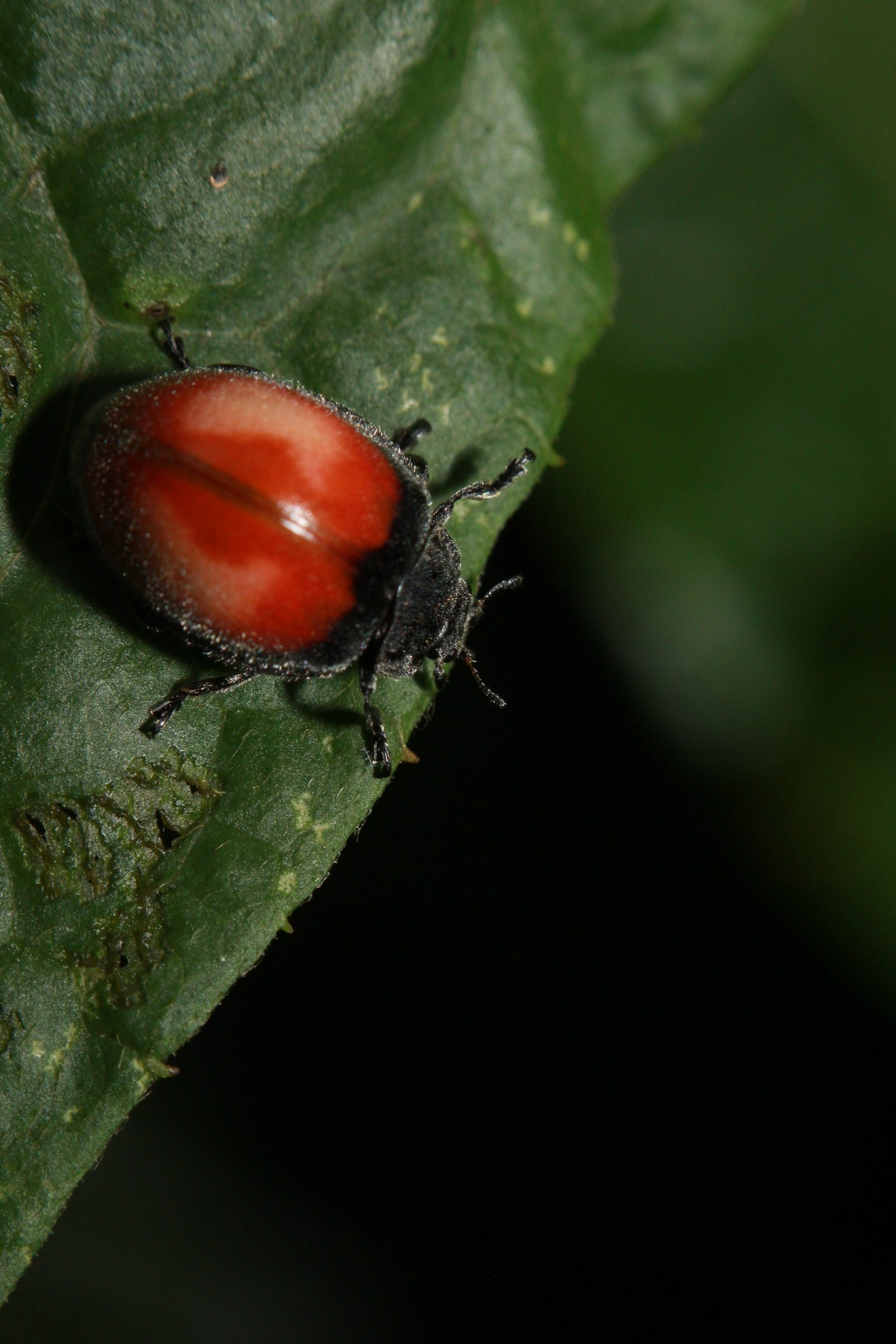

Scientific classification
- Kingdom: Animalia
- Phylum: Arthropoda
- Clade: Pancrustacea
- Class: Insecta
- Order: Coleoptera
- Suborder: Polyphaga
- Infraorder: Cucujiformia
- Family: Coccinellidae
- Genus: Toxotoma
- Species: T. discolor

Binomial name
- Toxotoma discolor (Erichson, 1847)

Synonyms
- Epilachna discolor Erichson, 1847; Epilachna boliviana Weise, 1895

= Toxotoma discolor =

Species of beetle

Toxotoma discolor is a species of beetle of the family Coccinellidae. It is found in Peru and Bolivia.

== Description ==
Adults reach a length of about 7.50–9.50 mm. Adults are black. The elytron is brownish yellow with greenish-black basal and apical margins and a pale yellow spot in the shape of a hourglass.
