= Toxotoma monovittata =

Scientific classification
- Kingdom: Animalia
- Phylum: Arthropoda
- Clade: Pancrustacea
- Class: Insecta
- Order: Coleoptera
- Suborder: Polyphaga
- Infraorder: Cucujiformia
- Family: Coccinellidae
- Genus: Toxotoma
- Species: T. monovittata

Binomial name
- Toxotoma monovittata (Gordon, 1975)

Synonyms
- Epilachna monovittata Gordon, 1975

Species of beetle

Toxotoma monovittata is a species of beetle of the family Coccinellidae. It is found in Colombia, Ecuador and Peru.

== Description ==
Adults reach a length of about 6.38–7.90 mm. Adults are black. The anterior angle of the pronotum is yellow and the elytron is dark yellow with a black margin and a black median vitta.
