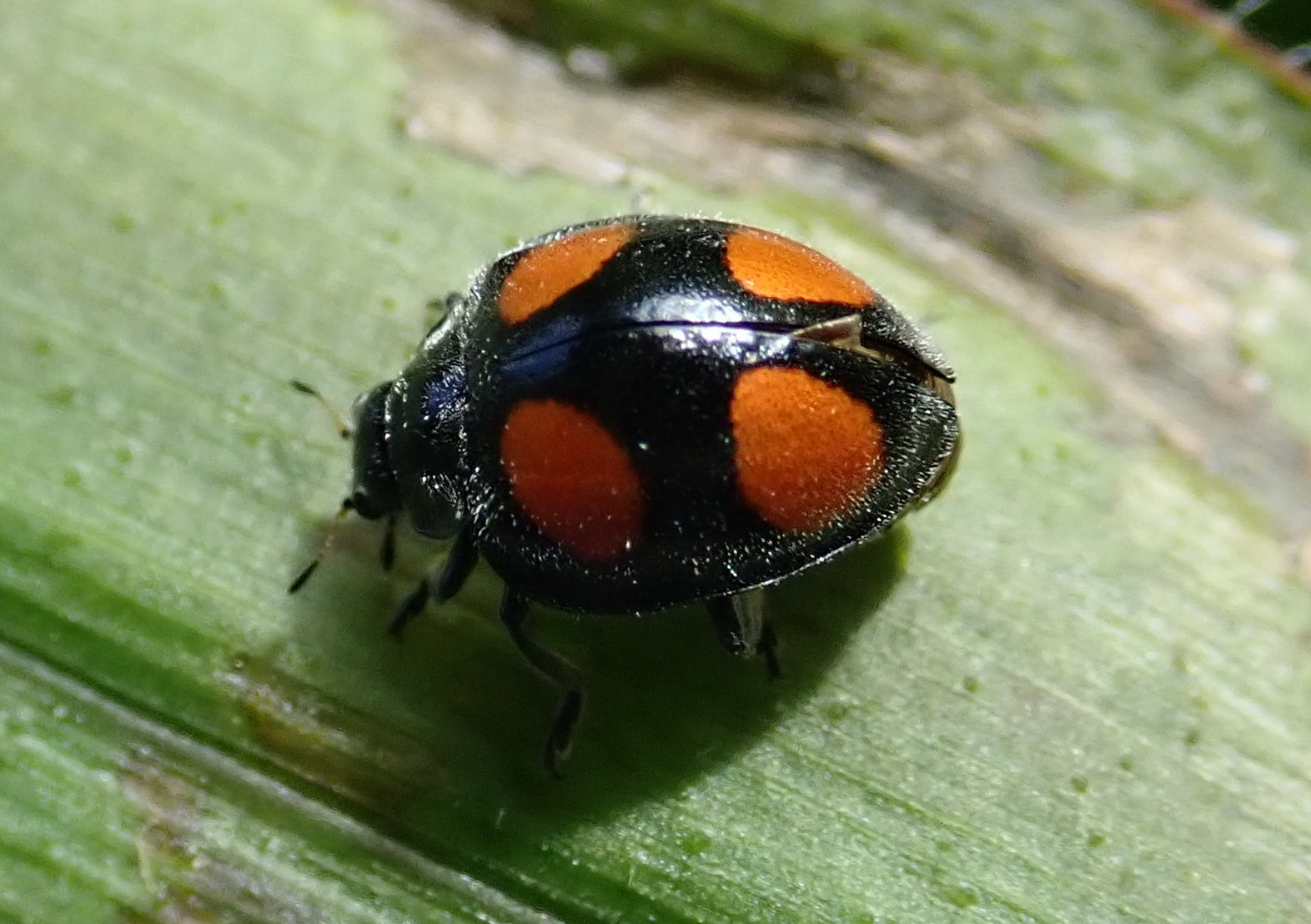

Scientific classification
- Kingdom: Animalia
- Phylum: Arthropoda
- Clade: Pancrustacea
- Class: Insecta
- Order: Coleoptera
- Suborder: Polyphaga
- Infraorder: Cucujiformia
- Family: Coccinellidae
- Genus: Toxotoma
- Species: T. aequatorialis

Binomial name
- Toxotoma aequatorialis (Gordon, 1975)

Synonyms
- Epilachna aequatorialis Gordon, 1975

= Toxotoma aequatorialis =

Species of beetle

Toxotoma aequatorialis is a species of beetle of the family Coccinellidae. It is found in Ecuador.

== Description ==
Adults reach a length of about 5.75 mm. Adults are dark brown. The anterolateral angle of the pronotum is yellow and the elytron is black with two large yellow spots.
