= Toxotoma staudingeri =

Scientific classification
- Kingdom: Animalia
- Phylum: Arthropoda
- Clade: Pancrustacea
- Class: Insecta
- Order: Coleoptera
- Suborder: Polyphaga
- Infraorder: Cucujiformia
- Family: Coccinellidae
- Genus: Toxotoma
- Species: T. staudingeri

Binomial name
- Toxotoma staudingeri (Weise, 1902)

Synonyms
- Solanophila staudingeri Weise, 1902

Species of beetle

Toxotoma staudingeri is a species of beetle of the family Coccinellidae. It is found in Bolivia and Peru.

== Description ==
Adults reach a length of about 8-9.41 mm. Adults are black. The lateral margin of the pronotum is yellow and the elytron is black with a bluish tinge and two yellow spots.
