= Toxotoma inserta =

Scientific classification
- Kingdom: Animalia
- Phylum: Arthropoda
- Clade: Pancrustacea
- Class: Insecta
- Order: Coleoptera
- Suborder: Polyphaga
- Infraorder: Cucujiformia
- Family: Coccinellidae
- Genus: Toxotoma
- Species: T. inserta

Binomial name
- Toxotoma inserta (Weise, 1900)

Synonyms
- Solanophila inserta Weise, 1900

Species of beetle

Toxotoma inserta is a species of beetle of the family Coccinellidae. It is found in Colombia.

== Description ==
Adults reach a length of about 5.32–7 mm. Adults are black. The anterolateral angle of the pronotum is yellow and the elytron has four pale yellow spots.
