= Toxotoma pretiosa =

Scientific classification
- Kingdom: Animalia
- Phylum: Arthropoda
- Clade: Pancrustacea
- Class: Insecta
- Order: Coleoptera
- Suborder: Polyphaga
- Infraorder: Cucujiformia
- Family: Coccinellidae
- Genus: Toxotoma
- Species: T. pretiosa

Binomial name
- Toxotoma pretiosa (Mader, 1958)

Synonyms
- Solanophila pretiosa Mader, 1958

Species of beetle

Toxotoma pretiosa is a species of beetle of the family Coccinellidae. It is found in Bolivia.

== Description ==
Adults reach a length of about 8.68–9.66 mm. Adults are black. The elytron is bluish black with two small yellow spots.
