= Toxotoma divisa =

Scientific classification
- Kingdom: Animalia
- Phylum: Arthropoda
- Clade: Pancrustacea
- Class: Insecta
- Order: Coleoptera
- Suborder: Polyphaga
- Infraorder: Cucujiformia
- Family: Coccinellidae
- Genus: Toxotoma
- Species: T. divisa

Binomial name
- Toxotoma divisa (Weise, 1900)

Synonyms
- Solanophila divisa Weise, 1900

Species of beetle

Toxotoma divisa is a species of beetle of the family Coccinellidae. It is found in Peru.

== Description ==
Adults reach a length of about 7 mm. Adults are black. The elytron is light tobacco brown with a black border and a black vitta.
