= Toxotoma orthostriata =

Scientific classification
- Kingdom: Animalia
- Phylum: Arthropoda
- Clade: Pancrustacea
- Class: Insecta
- Order: Coleoptera
- Suborder: Polyphaga
- Infraorder: Cucujiformia
- Family: Coccinellidae
- Genus: Toxotoma
- Species: T. orthostriata

Binomial name
- Toxotoma orthostriata (Gordon, 1975)

Synonyms
- Epilachna orthostriata Gordon, 1975

Species of beetle

Toxotoma orthostriata is a species of beetle of the family Coccinellidae. It is found in Bolivia.

== Description ==
Adults reach a length of about 8-10.50 mm. Adults are black. The elytron is yellow with a bluish-black margin and a bluish-black median vitta.
