= Toxotoma dives =

Scientific classification
- Kingdom: Animalia
- Phylum: Arthropoda
- Clade: Pancrustacea
- Class: Insecta
- Order: Coleoptera
- Suborder: Polyphaga
- Infraorder: Cucujiformia
- Family: Coccinellidae
- Genus: Toxotoma
- Species: T. dives

Binomial name
- Toxotoma dives (Erichson, 1847)

Synonyms
- Epilachna dives Erichson, 1847

Species of beetle

Toxotoma dives is a species of beetle of the family Coccinellidae. It is found in Peru.

== Description ==
Adults reach a length of about 7.25 – 10.83 mm. Adults are black. The elytron is bluish black with two round yellow spots.
