= Toxotoma bistrisignata =

Scientific classification
- Kingdom: Animalia
- Phylum: Arthropoda
- Clade: Pancrustacea
- Class: Insecta
- Order: Coleoptera
- Suborder: Polyphaga
- Infraorder: Cucujiformia
- Family: Coccinellidae
- Genus: Toxotoma
- Species: T. bistrisignata

Binomial name
- Toxotoma bistrisignata (Mader, 1950)

Synonyms
- Solanophila bistrisignata Mader, 1950

Species of beetle

Toxotoma bistrisignata is a species of beetle of the family Coccinellidae. It is found in Bolivia.

== Description ==
Adults reach a length of about 6.59 mm. Adults are dark brown. The anterolateral margin of the pronotum is yellow and the elytron is black with three yellow spots.
