= Toxotoma forsteri =

Scientific classification
- Kingdom: Animalia
- Phylum: Arthropoda
- Clade: Pancrustacea
- Class: Insecta
- Order: Coleoptera
- Suborder: Polyphaga
- Infraorder: Cucujiformia
- Family: Coccinellidae
- Genus: Toxotoma
- Species: T. forsteri

Binomial name
- Toxotoma forsteri Mader, 1958

Species of beetle

Toxotoma forsteri is a species of beetle of the family Coccinellidae. It is found in Bolivia.

== Description ==
Adults reach a length of about 7.94 mm. Adults are black. The elytron is dark blue with a large orange spot.
