= Toxotoma cruciata =

Scientific classification
- Kingdom: Animalia
- Phylum: Arthropoda
- Clade: Pancrustacea
- Class: Insecta
- Order: Coleoptera
- Suborder: Polyphaga
- Infraorder: Cucujiformia
- Family: Coccinellidae
- Genus: Toxotoma
- Species: T. cruciata

Binomial name
- Toxotoma cruciata (Mulsant, 1850)

Synonyms
- Epilachna cruciata Mulsant, 1850

Species of beetle

Toxotoma cruciata is a species of beetle of the family Coccinellidae. It is found in Venezuela.

== Description ==
Adults reach a length of about 7.50–10 mm. Adults are black. The elytron is yellow with the external and sutural margins and apical angle black. There is also a black spot.
