= Toxotoma =

Scientific classification
- Kingdom: Animalia
- Phylum: Arthropoda
- Clade: Pancrustacea
- Class: Insecta
- Order: Coleoptera
- Suborder: Polyphaga
- Infraorder: Cucujiformia
- Family: Coccinellidae
- Subfamily: Coccinellinae
- Tribe: Epilachnini
- Genus: Toxotoma; Weise, 1900

Genus of beetles

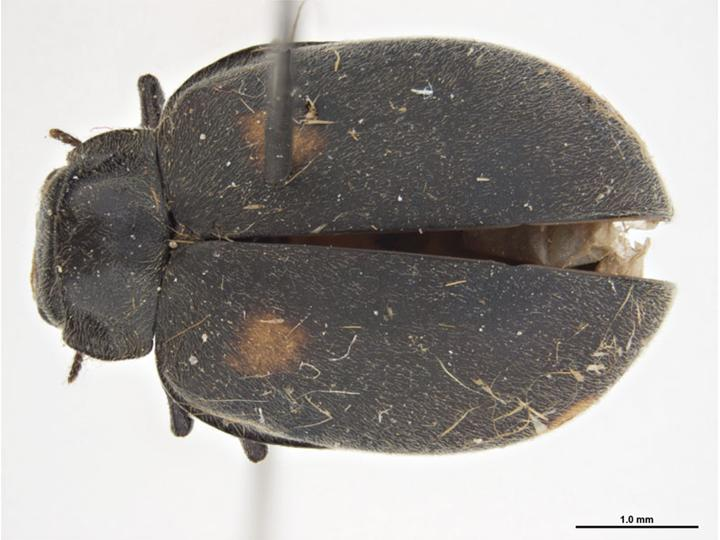
Toxotoma venusta

Toxotoma is a genus of beetles in the family Coccinellidae.

== Species ==
- Toxotoma aequatorialis
- Toxotoma aguascalientes
- Toxotoma andicola
- Toxotoma aureola
- Toxotoma azurea
- Toxotoma banosi
- Toxotoma bistrisignata
- Toxotoma bizonata
- Toxotoma chacoi
- Toxotoma chapini
- Toxotoma chigata
- Toxotoma convergens
- Toxotoma cruciata
- Toxotoma cuzcoensis
- Toxotoma discolor
- Toxotoma disparans
- Toxotoma dives
- Toxotoma divisa
- Toxotoma dorsigera
- Toxotoma dubia
- Toxotoma fausta
- Toxotoma fenestrata
- Toxotoma flavocirculus
- Toxotoma flavofasciata
- Toxotoma forsteri
- Toxotoma furtiva
- Toxotoma fuscopilosa
- Toxotoma gentilis
- Toxotoma geometrica
- Toxotoma gonzalezi
- Toxotoma guerini
- Toxotoma haywardi
- Toxotoma hiekei
- Toxotoma huanucoi
- Toxotoma humboldti
- Toxotoma hybridula
- Toxotoma imitator
- Toxotoma inserta
- Toxotoma jujuyi
- Toxotoma leechi
- Toxotoma lepida
- Toxotoma locotalis
- Toxotoma longicrura
- Toxotoma lorata
- Toxotoma mimetica
- Toxotoma monovittata
- Toxotoma murilloi
- Toxotoma nunenmacheri
- Toxotoma opacula
- Toxotoma opulenta
- Toxotoma orbicula
- Toxotoma orthostriata
- Toxotoma ostensoides
- Toxotoma paracuta
- Toxotoma patricia
- Toxotoma persimilis
- Toxotoma pilifera
- Toxotoma pretiosa
- Toxotoma pulchra
- Toxotoma rosae
- Toxotoma rugulosa
- Toxotoma satipensis
- Toxotoma soukupi
- Toxotoma staudingeri
- Toxotoma taeniola
- Toxotoma tetartea
- Toxotoma townsendi
- Toxotoma tridentata
- Toxotoma univittata
- Toxotoma v-pallidum
- Toxotoma venezuelae
- Toxotoma venusta
- Toxotoma weyrauchi
- Toxotoma zischkai
