= Epilachna aculata =

Scientific classification
- Kingdom: Animalia
- Phylum: Arthropoda
- Clade: Pancrustacea
- Class: Insecta
- Order: Coleoptera
- Suborder: Polyphaga
- Infraorder: Cucujiformia
- Family: Coccinellidae
- Genus: Epilachna
- Species: E. aculata

Binomial name
- Epilachna aculata Gordon, 1975

Species of beetle

Epilachna aculata is a species of beetle of the family Coccinellidae. It is found in Colombia.

== Description ==
Adults reach a length of about 5.75–6.75 mm. Adults are dark brown. The anterolateral angle of the pronotum is yellow and the elytron is black with two large orange spots.
