= Toxotoma zischkai =

Scientific classification
- Kingdom: Animalia
- Phylum: Arthropoda
- Clade: Pancrustacea
- Class: Insecta
- Order: Coleoptera
- Suborder: Polyphaga
- Infraorder: Cucujiformia
- Family: Coccinellidae
- Genus: Toxotoma
- Species: T. zischkai

Binomial name
- Toxotoma zischkai (Mader, 1950)

Synonyms
- Solanophila zischkai Mader, 1950

Species of beetle

Toxotoma zischkai is a species of beetle of the family Coccinellidae. It is found in Bolivia.

== Description ==
Adults reach a length of about 4.50–5.80 mm. Adults are black. The elytron is black with two large yellow spots.
