= Epilachna woytkowskii =

Scientific classification
- Kingdom: Animalia
- Phylum: Arthropoda
- Clade: Pancrustacea
- Class: Insecta
- Order: Coleoptera
- Suborder: Polyphaga
- Infraorder: Cucujiformia
- Family: Coccinellidae
- Genus: Epilachna
- Species: E. woytkowskii

Binomial name
- Epilachna woytkowskii Gordon, 1975

Species of beetle

Epilachna woytkowskii is a species of beetle of the family Coccinellidae. It is found in Peru and Bolivia.

== Description ==
Adults reach a length of about 6.35–8.78 mm. Adults are black. The anterolateral angle of the pronotum is yellow and the elytron has two large orange spots.
