= Toxotoma azurea =

Scientific classification
- Kingdom: Animalia
- Phylum: Arthropoda
- Clade: Pancrustacea
- Class: Insecta
- Order: Coleoptera
- Suborder: Polyphaga
- Infraorder: Cucujiformia
- Family: Coccinellidae
- Genus: Toxotoma
- Species: T. azurea

Binomial name
- Toxotoma azurea (Laporte, 1840)

Synonyms
- Coccinella azurea Laporte, 1840; Solanophila gemina Weise, 1900

Species of beetle

Toxotoma azurea is a species of beetle of the family Coccinellidae. It is found in Colombia.

== Description ==
Adults reach a length of about 8.25–11 mm. Adults are bluish-black. The elytron is bluish black with two large yellow or orange spots.

The larvae are smaller, having yellowish bodies with large spines and brown spots

== Diet ==
Toxotoma azurea are a herbivorous species of beetle, damaging the parenchyma of the leaves
