= Toxotoma tridentata =

Scientific classification
- Kingdom: Animalia
- Phylum: Arthropoda
- Clade: Pancrustacea
- Class: Insecta
- Order: Coleoptera
- Suborder: Polyphaga
- Infraorder: Cucujiformia
- Family: Coccinellidae
- Genus: Toxotoma
- Species: T. tridentata

Binomial name
- Toxotoma tridentata Gordon, 1975

Species of beetle

Toxotoma tridentata is a species of beetle of the family Coccinellidae. It is found in Peru.

== Description ==
Adults reach a length of about 7.44 – 8.00 mm. Adults are black. The elytron is dark bluish green with two yellow spots.
