= Toxotoma pilifera =

Scientific classification
- Kingdom: Animalia
- Phylum: Arthropoda
- Clade: Pancrustacea
- Class: Insecta
- Order: Coleoptera
- Suborder: Polyphaga
- Infraorder: Cucujiformia
- Family: Coccinellidae
- Genus: Toxotoma
- Species: T. pilifera

Binomial name
- Toxotoma pilifera (Weise, 1895)

Synonyms
- Epilachna pilifera Weise, 1895

Species of beetle

Toxotoma pilifera is a species of beetle of the family Coccinellidae. It is found in Bolivia.

== Description ==
Adults reach a length of about 6.68 – 6.89 mm. Adults are black. The elytron is dark bluish black with a broad orange band.
