= Epilachna nigripes =

Scientific classification
- Kingdom: Animalia
- Phylum: Arthropoda
- Clade: Pancrustacea
- Class: Insecta
- Order: Coleoptera
- Suborder: Polyphaga
- Infraorder: Cucujiformia
- Family: Coccinellidae
- Genus: Epilachna
- Species: E. nigripes

Binomial name
- Epilachna nigripes Weise, 1895

Species of beetle

Epilachna nigripes is a species of beetle of the family Coccinellidae. It is found in Ecuador.

== Description ==
Adults reach a length of about 8–10 mm. Adults are similar to Epilachna velutina, but the legs are black and there is a yellow lateral border.
