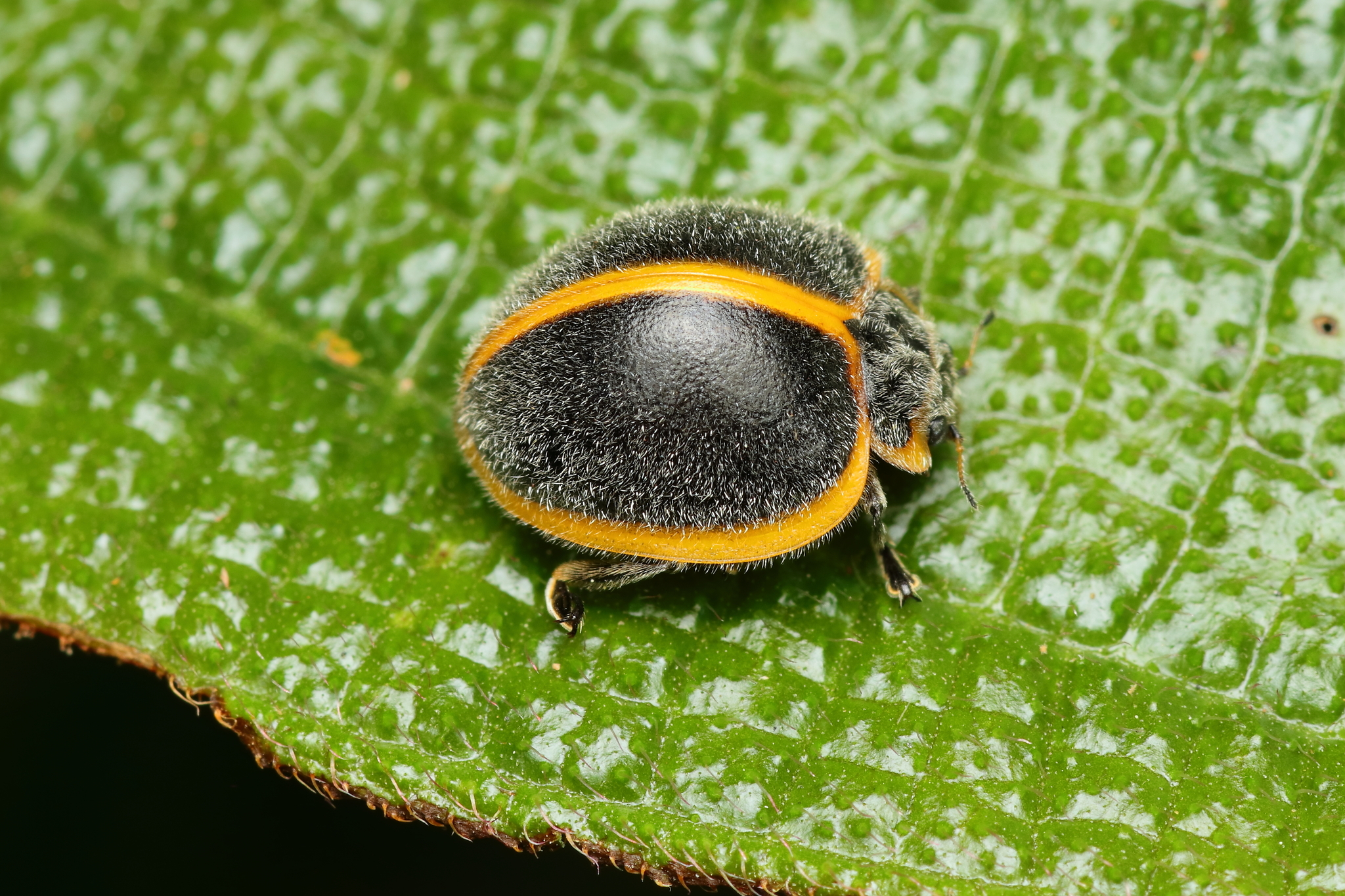

Scientific classification
- Kingdom: Animalia
- Phylum: Arthropoda
- Clade: Pancrustacea
- Class: Insecta
- Order: Coleoptera
- Suborder: Polyphaga
- Infraorder: Cucujiformia
- Family: Coccinellidae
- Genus: Epilachna
- Species: E. velutina

Binomial name
- Epilachna velutina (Olivier, 1808)

Synonyms
- Coccinella velutina Olivier, 1808

= Epilachna velutina =

Species of beetle

Epilachna velutina is a species of beetle of the family Coccinellidae. It is found in French Guiana and Suriname.

== Description ==
Adults reach a length of about 7.83-9.51 mm. Adults are dark reddish brown. The elytron is dark chestnut brown with the lateral margin bordered with yellow.
