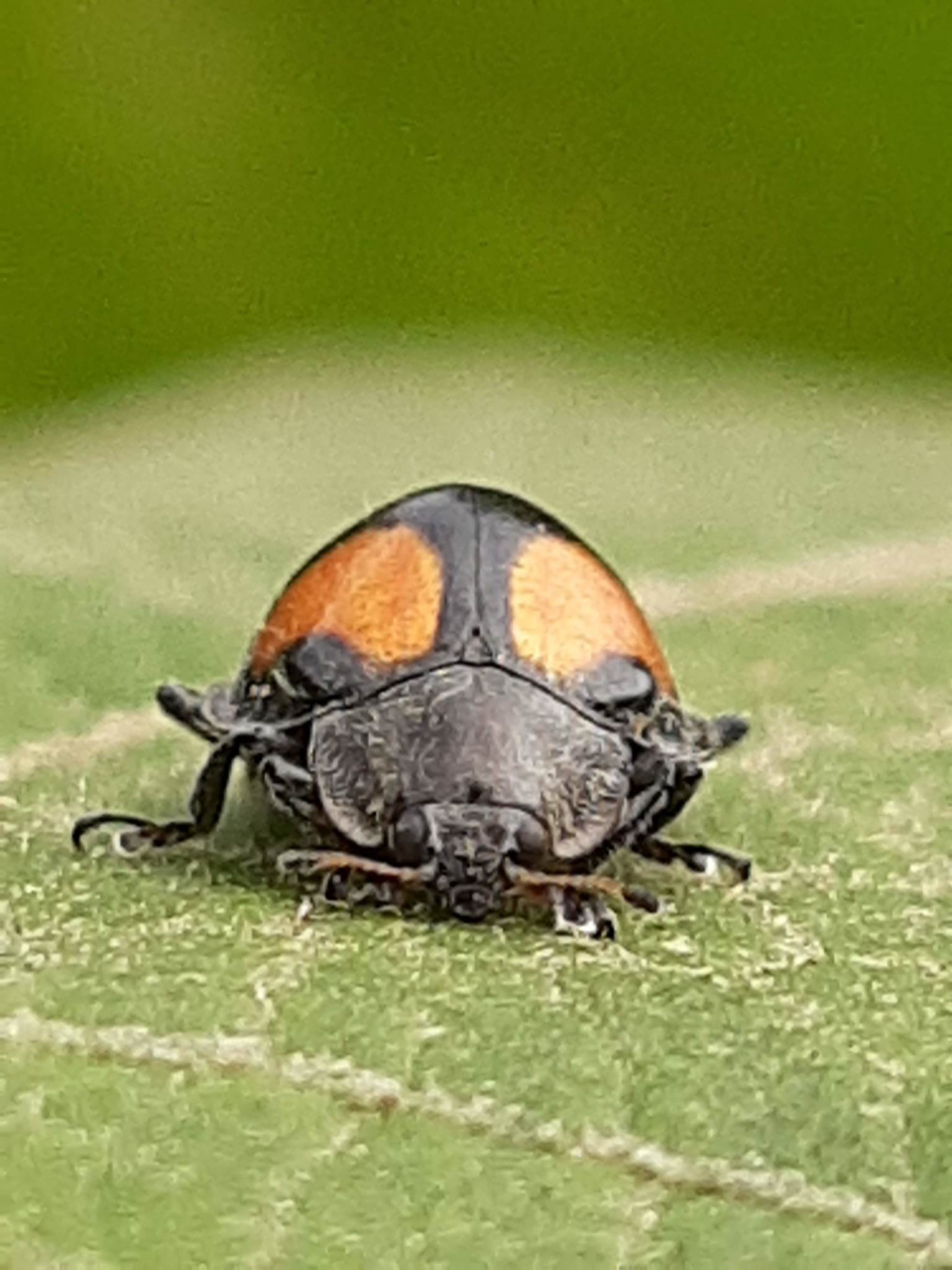

Scientific classification
- Kingdom: Animalia
- Phylum: Arthropoda
- Clade: Pancrustacea
- Class: Insecta
- Order: Coleoptera
- Suborder: Polyphaga
- Infraorder: Cucujiformia
- Family: Coccinellidae
- Genus: Epilachna
- Species: E. angustata

Binomial name
- Epilachna angustata Mulsant, 1850

= Epilachna angustata =

Species of beetle

Epilachna angustata is a species of beetle of the family Coccinellidae. It is found in Colombia and Venezuela.

== Description ==
Adults reach a length of about 6–7.85 mm. Adults are similar to Epilachna colombiana.
