= Epilachna colombiana =

Scientific classification
- Kingdom: Animalia
- Phylum: Arthropoda
- Clade: Pancrustacea
- Class: Insecta
- Order: Coleoptera
- Suborder: Polyphaga
- Infraorder: Cucujiformia
- Family: Coccinellidae
- Genus: Epilachna
- Species: E. colombiana

Binomial name
- Epilachna colombiana Gordon, 1985

Synonyms
- Epilachna kraatzi Gordon, 1975 (preocc.)

Species of beetle

Epilachna colombiana is a species of beetle of the family Coccinellidae. It is found in Colombia.

== Description ==
Adults reach a length of about 6–7.33 mm. Adults are black. The anterolateral angle of the pronotum is yellow and the elytron is black with two yellow spots.
