= Epilachna erichsoni =

Scientific classification
- Kingdom: Animalia
- Phylum: Arthropoda
- Clade: Pancrustacea
- Class: Insecta
- Order: Coleoptera
- Suborder: Polyphaga
- Infraorder: Cucujiformia
- Family: Coccinellidae
- Genus: Epilachna
- Species: E. erichsoni

Binomial name
- Epilachna erichsoni Crotch, 1874

Species of beetle

Epilachna erichsoni is a species of beetle of the family Coccinellidae. It is found in Panama.

== Description ==
Adults reach a length of about 8.10–10.61 mm. Adults are similar to Epilachna plagiata.
