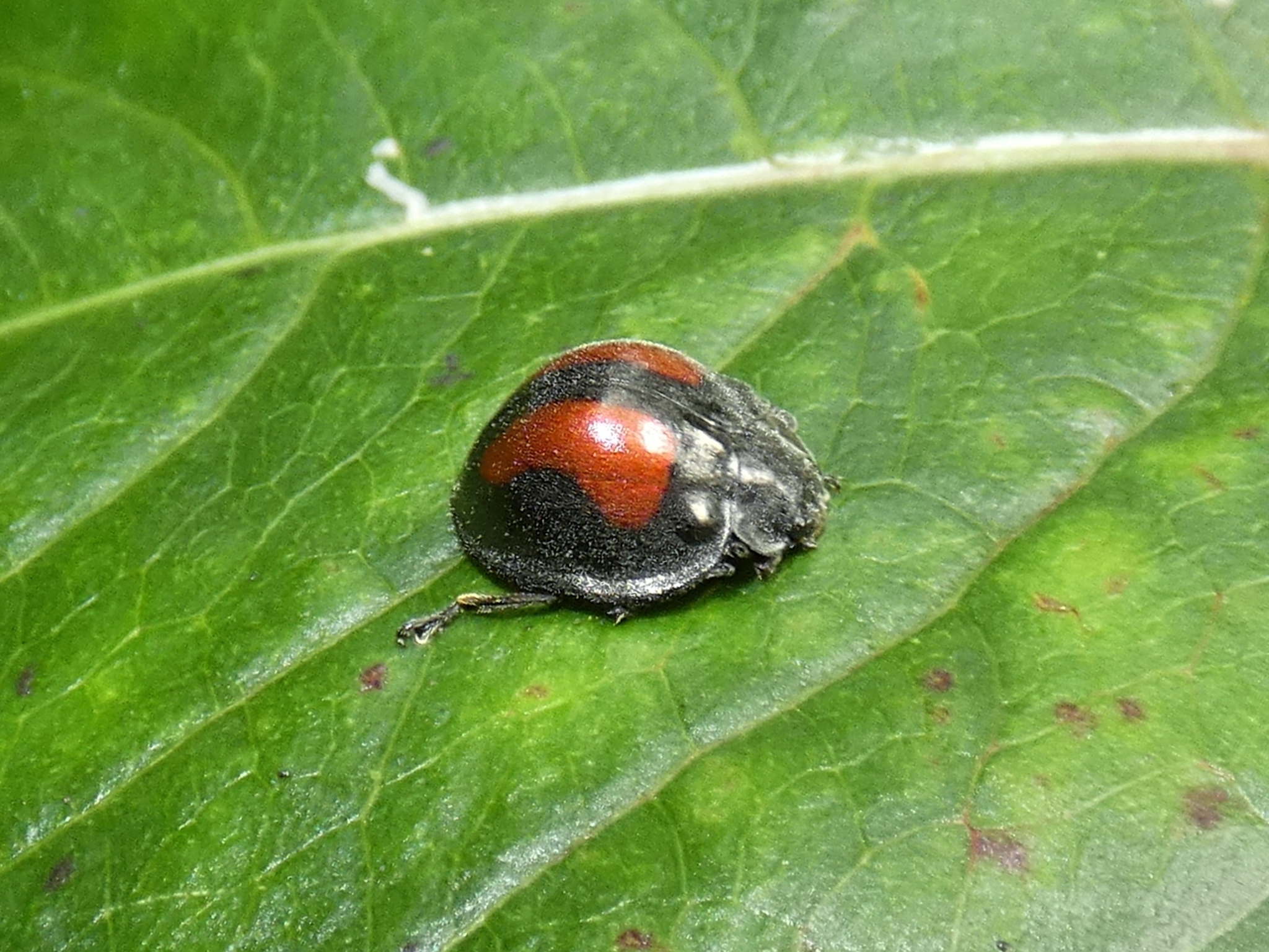

Scientific classification
- Kingdom: Animalia
- Phylum: Arthropoda
- Clade: Pancrustacea
- Class: Insecta
- Order: Coleoptera
- Suborder: Polyphaga
- Infraorder: Cucujiformia
- Family: Coccinellidae
- Genus: Epilachna
- Species: E. plagiata

Binomial name
- Epilachna plagiata Gorham, 1899

= Epilachna plagiata =

Species of beetle

Epilachna plagiata is a species of beetle of the family Coccinellidae. It is found in Panama and Costa Rica.

== Description ==
Adults reach a length of about 8.65–11.10 mm. Adults are black. The elytron is black with two large dark-red spots.
