= Epilachna cuscoi =

Scientific classification
- Kingdom: Animalia
- Phylum: Arthropoda
- Clade: Pancrustacea
- Class: Insecta
- Order: Coleoptera
- Suborder: Polyphaga
- Infraorder: Cucujiformia
- Family: Coccinellidae
- Genus: Epilachna
- Species: E. cuscoi

Binomial name
- Epilachna cuscoi Gordon, 1975

Species of beetle

Epilachna cuscoi is a species of beetle of the family Coccinellidae. It is found in Peru.

== Description ==
Adults reach a length of about 9.53–11.00 mm. Adults are similar to Epilachna sellata, but the discal spot is much larger.
