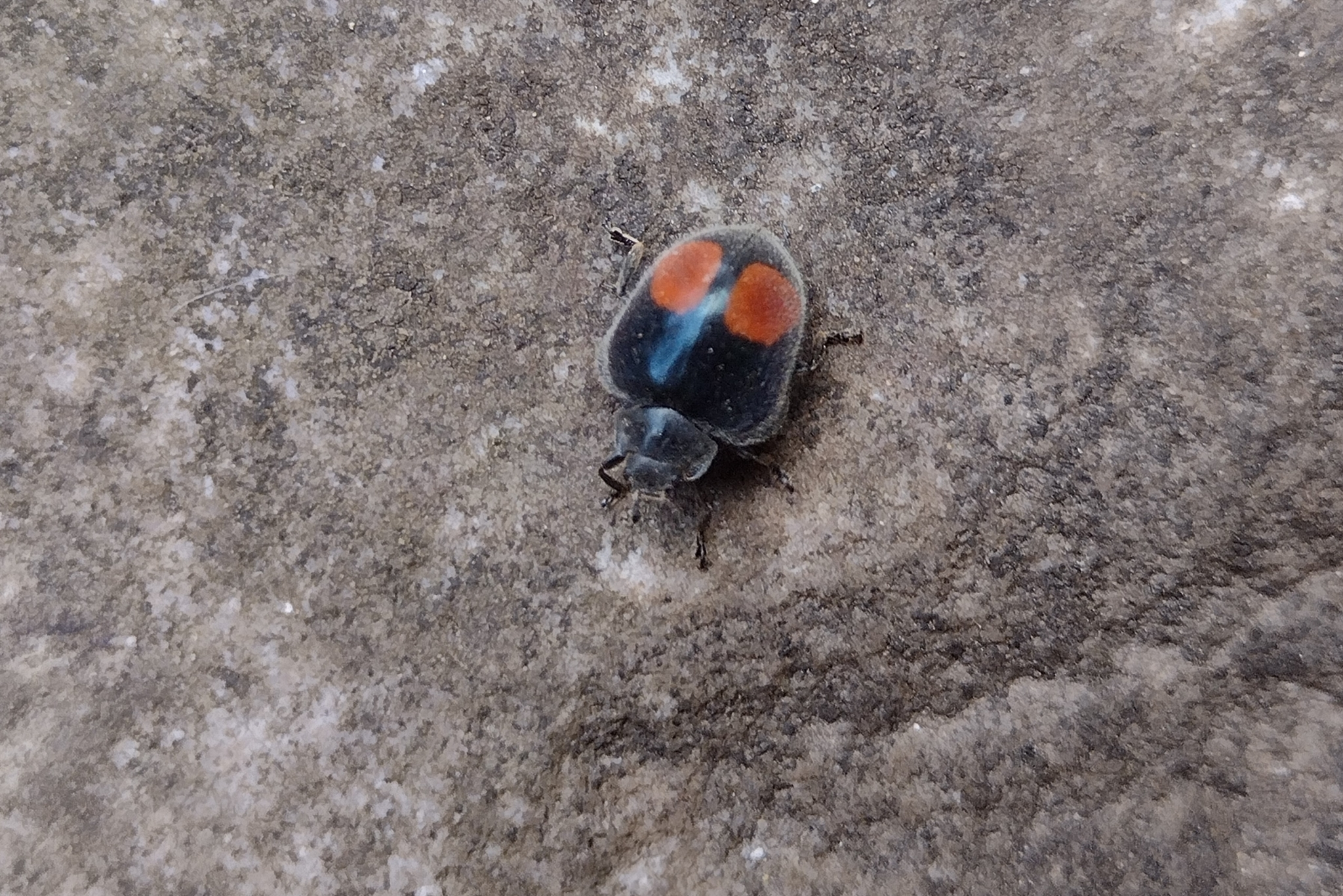

Scientific classification
- Kingdom: Animalia
- Phylum: Arthropoda
- Clade: Pancrustacea
- Class: Insecta
- Order: Coleoptera
- Suborder: Polyphaga
- Infraorder: Cucujiformia
- Family: Coccinellidae
- Genus: Epilachna
- Species: E. sellata

Binomial name
- Epilachna sellata Weise, 1895

= Epilachna sellata =

Species of beetle

Epilachna sellata is a species of beetle of the family Coccinellidae. It is found in Peru, Bolivia and Argentina.

== Description ==
Adults reach a length of about 8.10-9.68 mm. Adults are black. The elytron is bluish black with a large yellow spot.
