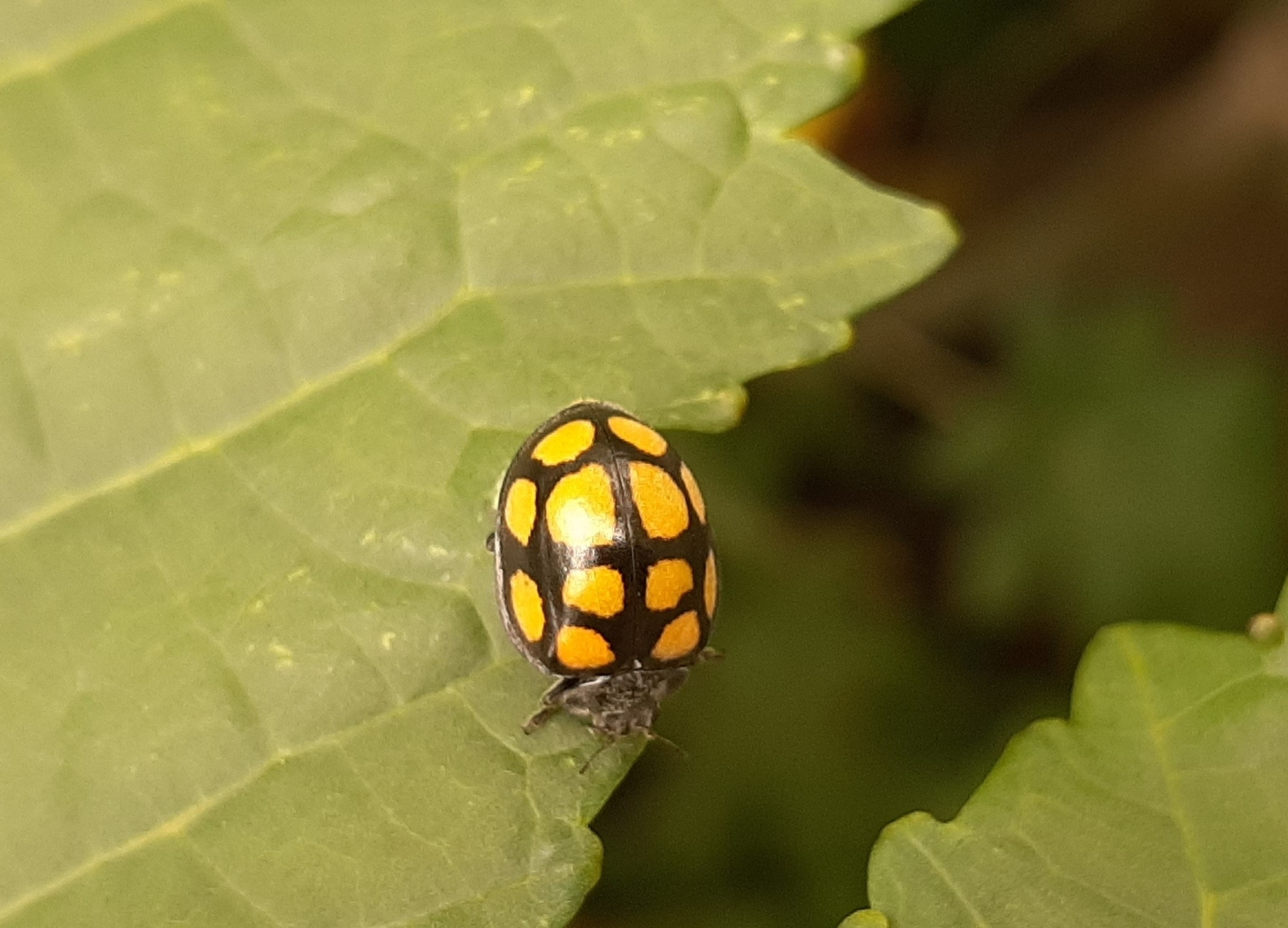

Scientific classification
- Kingdom: Animalia
- Phylum: Arthropoda
- Clade: Pancrustacea
- Class: Insecta
- Order: Coleoptera
- Suborder: Polyphaga
- Infraorder: Cucujiformia
- Family: Coccinellidae
- Genus: Epilachna
- Species: E. mexicana

Binomial name
- Epilachna mexicana (Guérin-Méneville, 1844)

Synonyms
- Coccinella mexicana Guérin-Méneville, 1844; Epilachna defecta Mulsant, 1850; Epilachna fuscipes Mulsant, 1850

= Epilachna mexicana =

Species of beetle

Epilachna mexicana is a species of beetle of the family Coccinellidae. It is found in Colombia, El Salvador, Guatemala, Honduras, Nicaragua, Panama and Mexico.

== Description ==
Adults reach a length of about 7.70–10.58 mm. Adults are black. The elytron is piceous with six large yellow spots.
