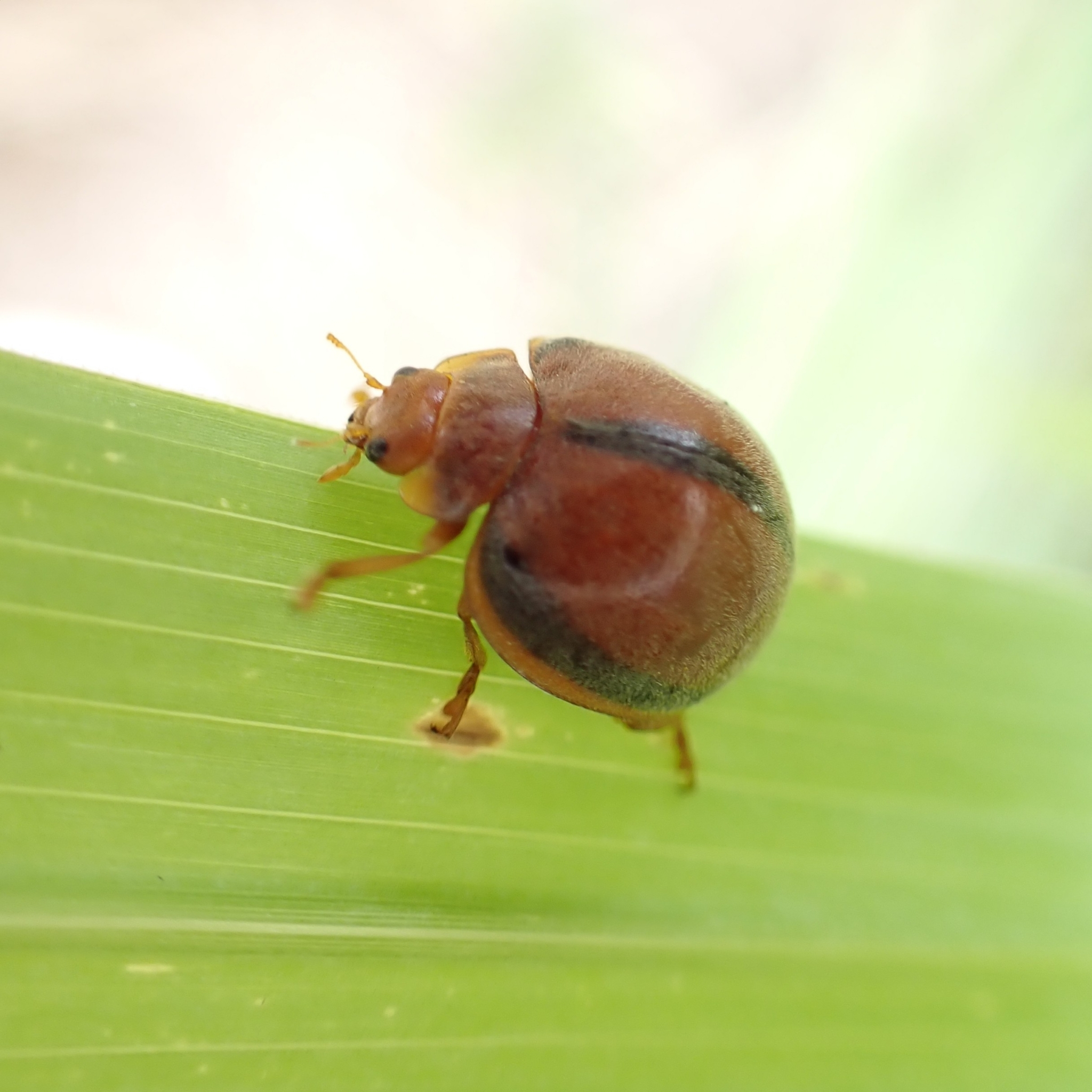

Scientific classification
- Kingdom: Animalia
- Phylum: Arthropoda
- Clade: Pancrustacea
- Class: Insecta
- Order: Coleoptera
- Suborder: Polyphaga
- Infraorder: Cucujiformia
- Family: Coccinellidae
- Genus: Epilachna
- Species: E. cacica

Binomial name
- Epilachna cacica (Guérin-Méneville, 1844)

Synonyms
- Coccinella cacica Guérin-Méneville, 1844; Epilachna praecincta Erichson, 1847; Epilachna serva Mulsant, 1856

= Epilachna cacica =

Species of beetle

Epilachna cacica is a species of beetle of the family Coccinellidae. It is found in Brazil, Colombia, Ecuador, Paraguay, Peru, Bolivia and Argentina.

== Description ==
Adults reach a length of about 7–10.90 mm. Adults are yellowish brown. The anterolateral angle of the pronotum is yellow. The elytron has a yellow lateral margin, bordered by a black vitta.
