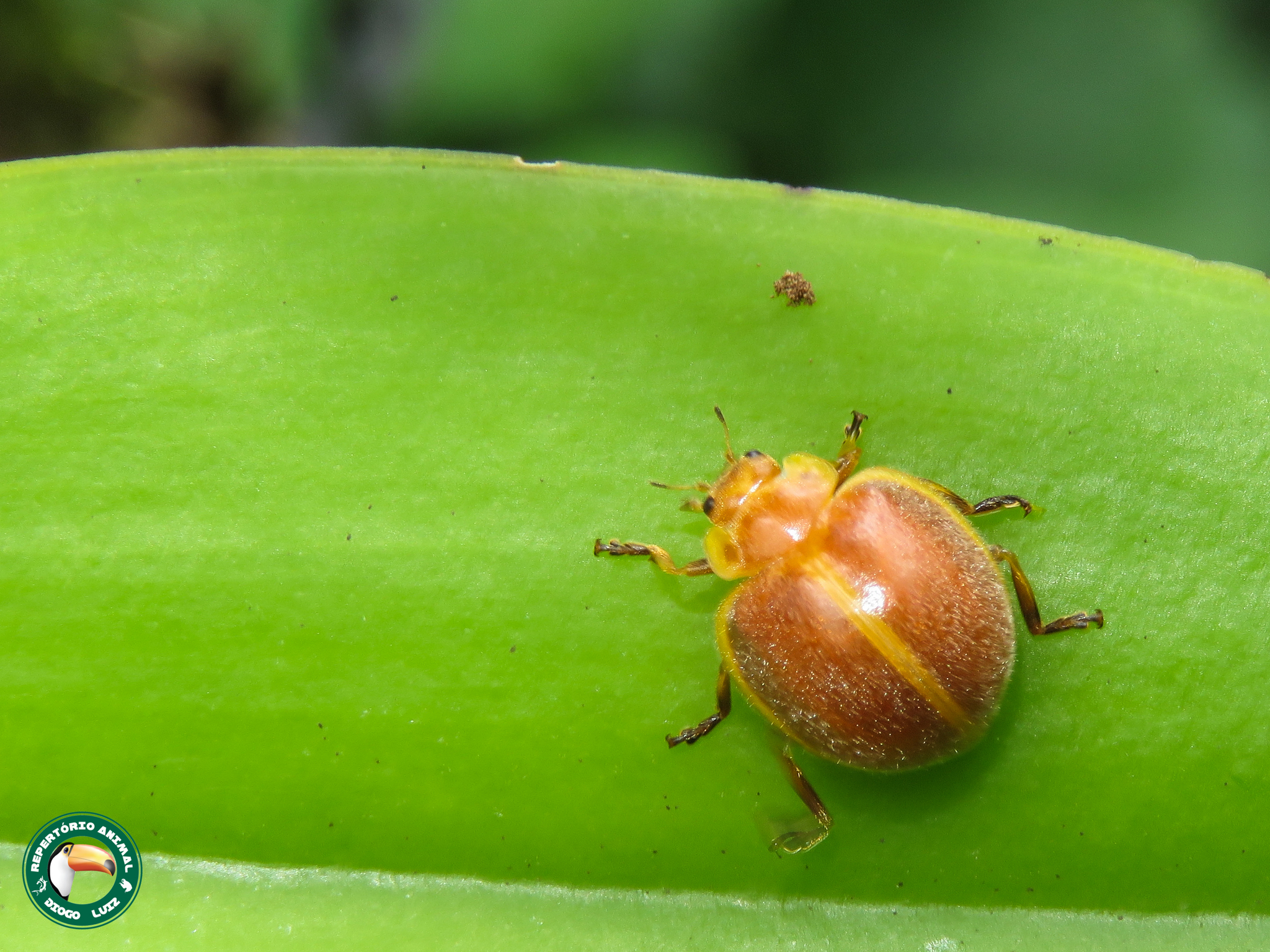

Scientific classification
- Kingdom: Animalia
- Phylum: Arthropoda
- Clade: Pancrustacea
- Class: Insecta
- Order: Coleoptera
- Suborder: Polyphaga
- Infraorder: Cucujiformia
- Family: Coccinellidae
- Genus: Epilachna
- Species: E. marginella

Binomial name
- Epilachna marginella (Fabricius, 1787)

Synonyms
- Coccinella marginella Fabricius, 1787; Coccinella albicincta Germar, 1824

= Epilachna marginella =

Species of beetle

Epilachna marginella is a species of beetle of the family Coccinellidae. It is found in Brazil.

== Description ==
Adults reach a length of about 8.46-10.15 mm. Adults are reddish brown. The lateral margin of the pronotum is yellow and the elytron is light reddish brown with the suture and lateral margin bordered with yellow.
