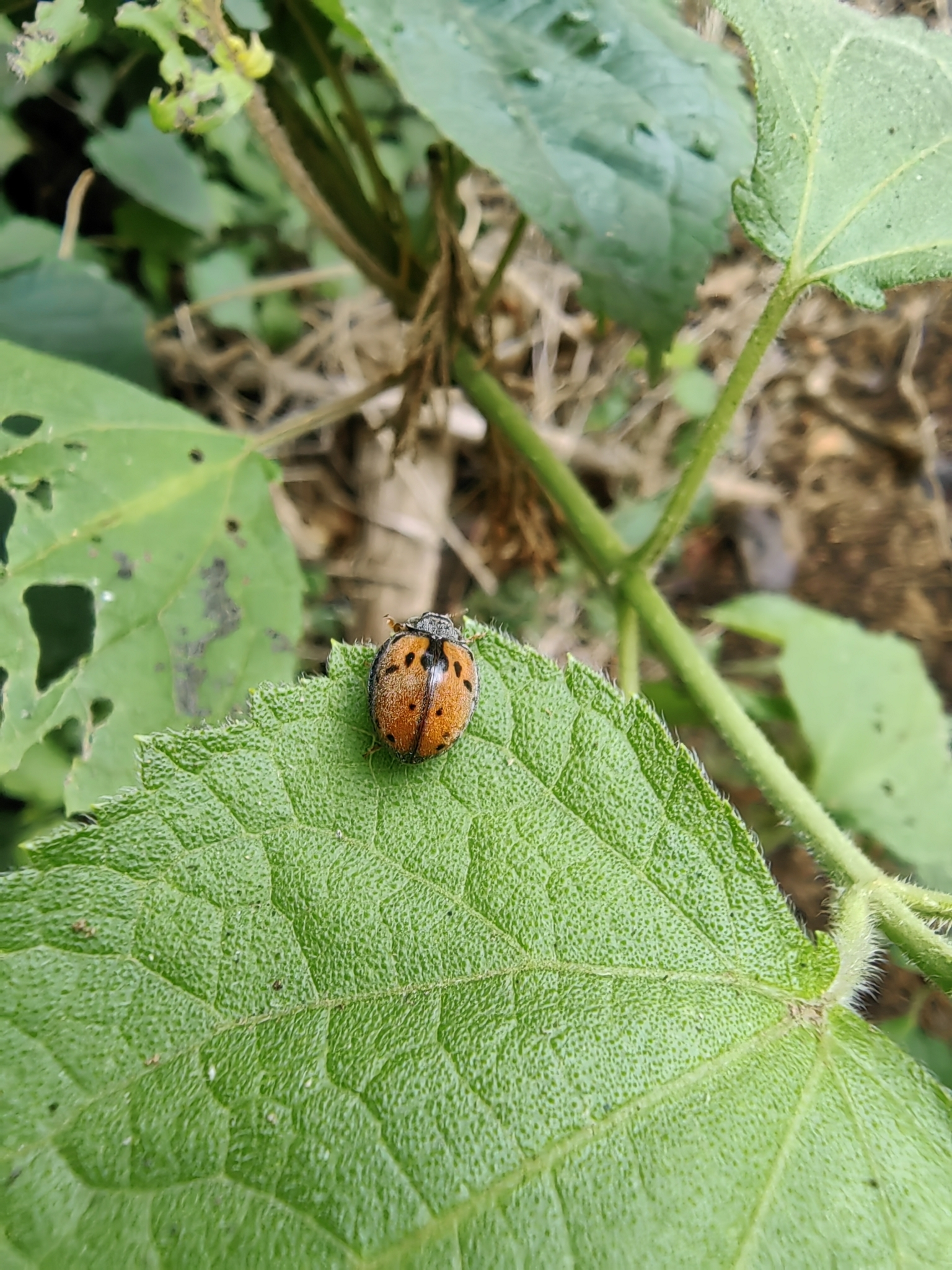

Scientific classification
- Kingdom: Animalia
- Phylum: Arthropoda
- Clade: Pancrustacea
- Class: Insecta
- Order: Coleoptera
- Suborder: Polyphaga
- Infraorder: Cucujiformia
- Family: Coccinellidae
- Genus: Epilachna
- Species: E. vincta

Binomial name
- Epilachna vincta Crotch, 1874

= Epilachna vincta =

Species of beetle

Epilachna vincta is a species of beetle of the family Coccinellidae. It is found in Mexico, Costa Rica, Honduras and Guatemala.

== Description ==
Adults reach a length of about 5.70–7.68 mm. Adults are yellowish brown. The head is black with a yellow V-shaped frontal area. The pronotum has a median black spot and the elytron is yellow with six black spots and a curved black mark.
