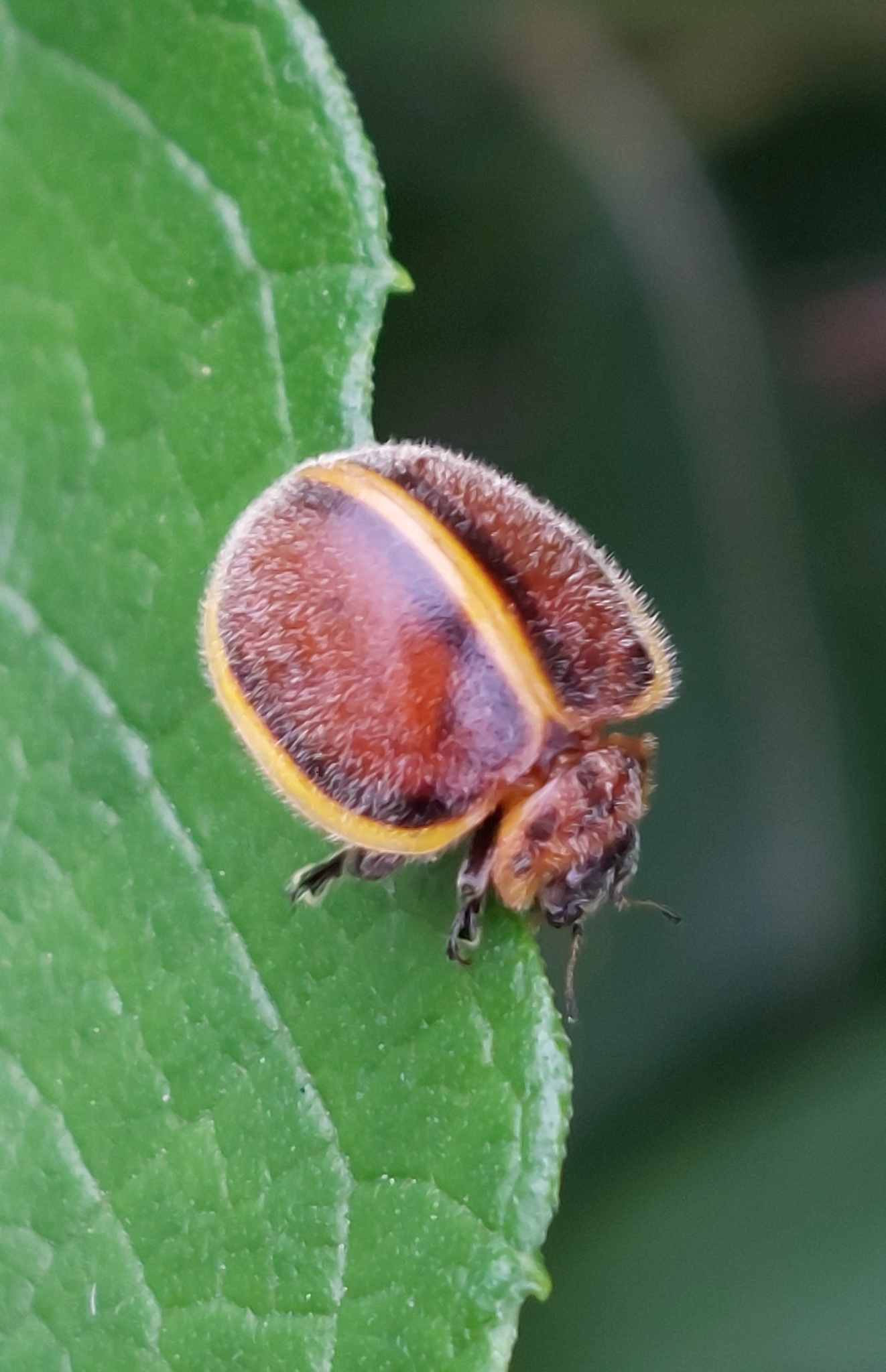

Scientific classification
- Kingdom: Animalia
- Phylum: Arthropoda
- Clade: Pancrustacea
- Class: Insecta
- Order: Coleoptera
- Suborder: Polyphaga
- Infraorder: Cucujiformia
- Family: Coccinellidae
- Genus: Epilachna
- Species: E. circumcincta

Binomial name
- Epilachna circumcincta Mulsant, 1850

= Epilachna circumcincta =

Species of beetle

Epilachna circumcincta is a species of beetle of the family Coccinellidae. It is found in Brazil.

== Description ==
Adults reach a length of about 7.10–8.80 mm. Adults are black. The lateral margin of the pronotum is pale yellow and the elytron has a yellow border. Inside this yellow border is a piceous border and the disk of the elytron is brownish yellow.
