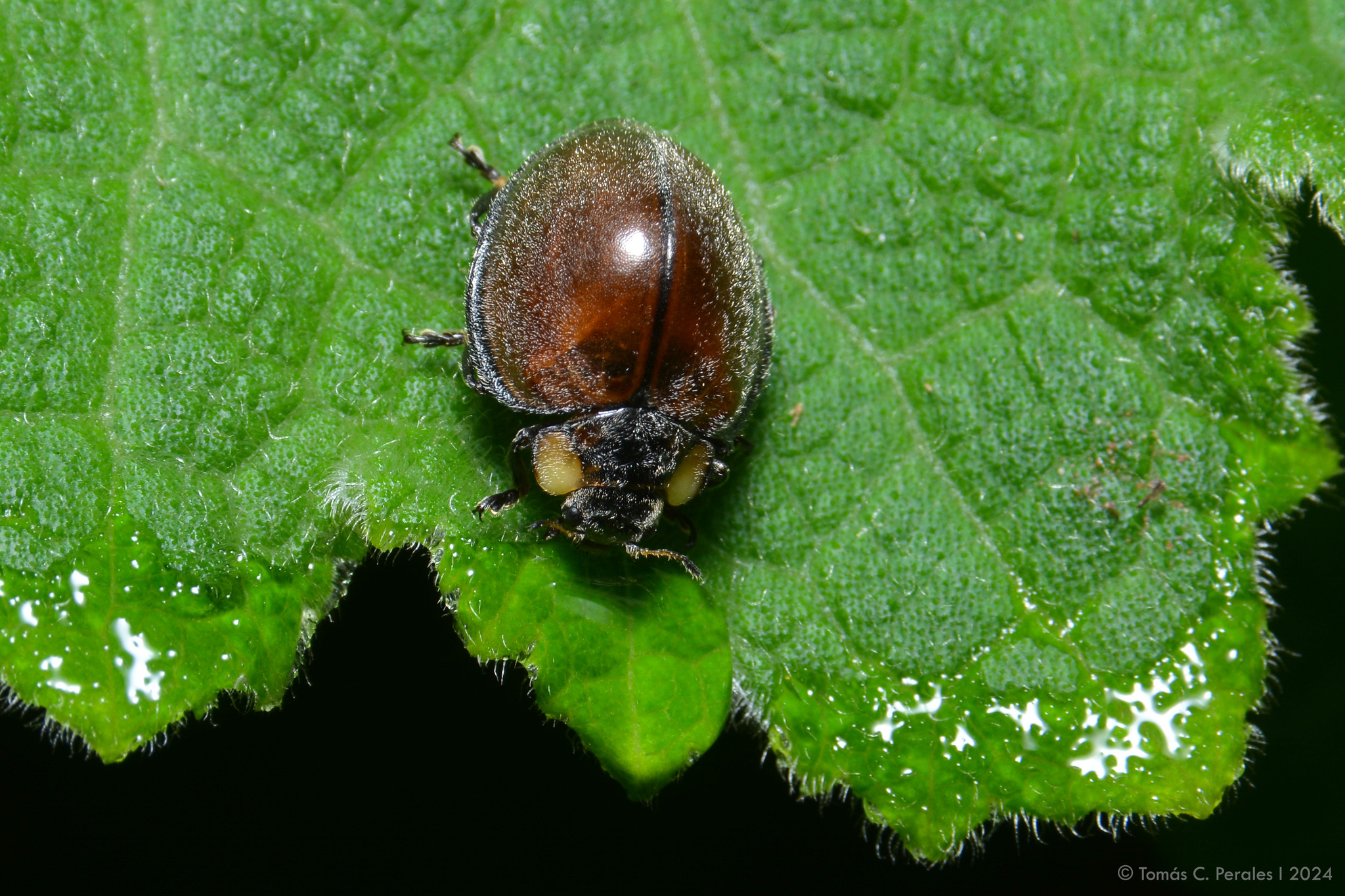

Scientific classification
- Kingdom: Animalia
- Phylum: Arthropoda
- Clade: Pancrustacea
- Class: Insecta
- Order: Coleoptera
- Suborder: Polyphaga
- Infraorder: Cucujiformia
- Family: Coccinellidae
- Genus: Epilachna
- Species: E. pastica

Binomial name
- Epilachna pastica (Weise, 1902)

Synonyms
- Solanophila pastica Weise, 1902; Solanophila gibbula Weise, 1902

= Epilachna pastica =

Species of beetle

Epilachna pastica is a species of beetle of the family Coccinellidae. It is found in Argentina, Peru and Bolivia.

== Description ==
Adults reach a length of about 9.75–11.80 mm. The elytron is reddish brown with a black border.
