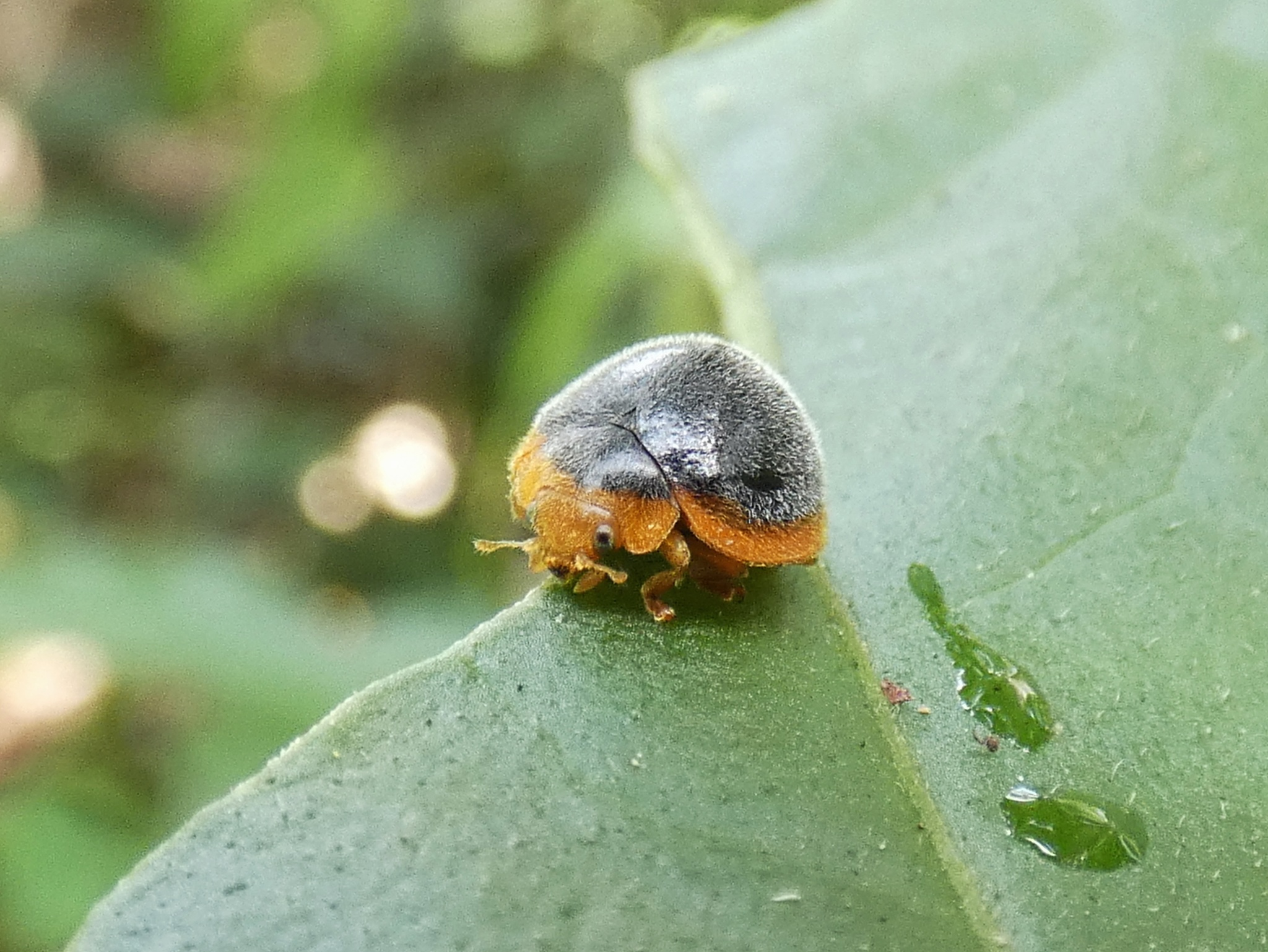

Scientific classification
- Kingdom: Animalia
- Phylum: Arthropoda
- Clade: Pancrustacea
- Class: Insecta
- Order: Coleoptera
- Suborder: Polyphaga
- Infraorder: Cucujiformia
- Family: Coccinellidae
- Genus: Epilachna
- Species: E. pseudorealis

Binomial name
- Epilachna pseudorealis Gordon, 1975

= Epilachna pseudorealis =

Species of beetle

Epilachna pseudorealis is a species of beetle of the family Coccinellidae. It is found in Panama and Colombia.

== Description ==
Adults reach a length of about 9.30–10.05 mm. Adults are brownish yellow. The pronotum is yellow laterally and the median two-thirds are piceous. The elytron is piceous with pale margins.
