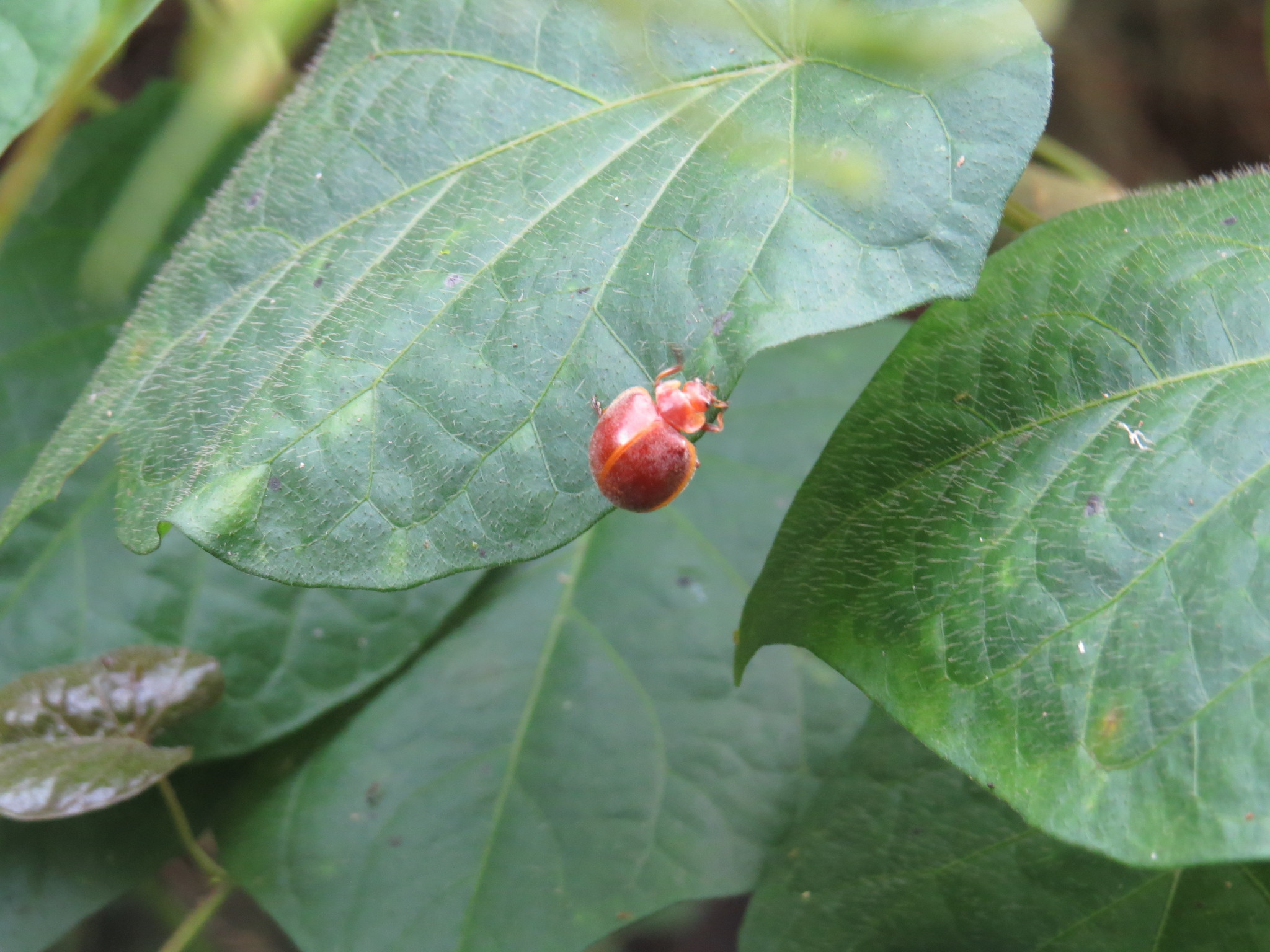

Scientific classification
- Kingdom: Animalia
- Phylum: Arthropoda
- Clade: Pancrustacea
- Class: Insecta
- Order: Coleoptera
- Suborder: Polyphaga
- Infraorder: Cucujiformia
- Family: Coccinellidae
- Genus: Epilachna
- Species: E. spreta

Binomial name
- Epilachna spreta Mulsant, 1850

= Epilachna spreta =

Species of beetle

Epilachna spreta is a species of beetle of the family Coccinellidae. It is found in Brazil.

== Description ==
Adults reach a length of about 8.30–11.50 mm. Adults are black. The pronotum is yellow with seven black spots. The elytron has a pale yellow border. Inside this yellow border is a black border and the disk of the elytron is brownish yellow.
