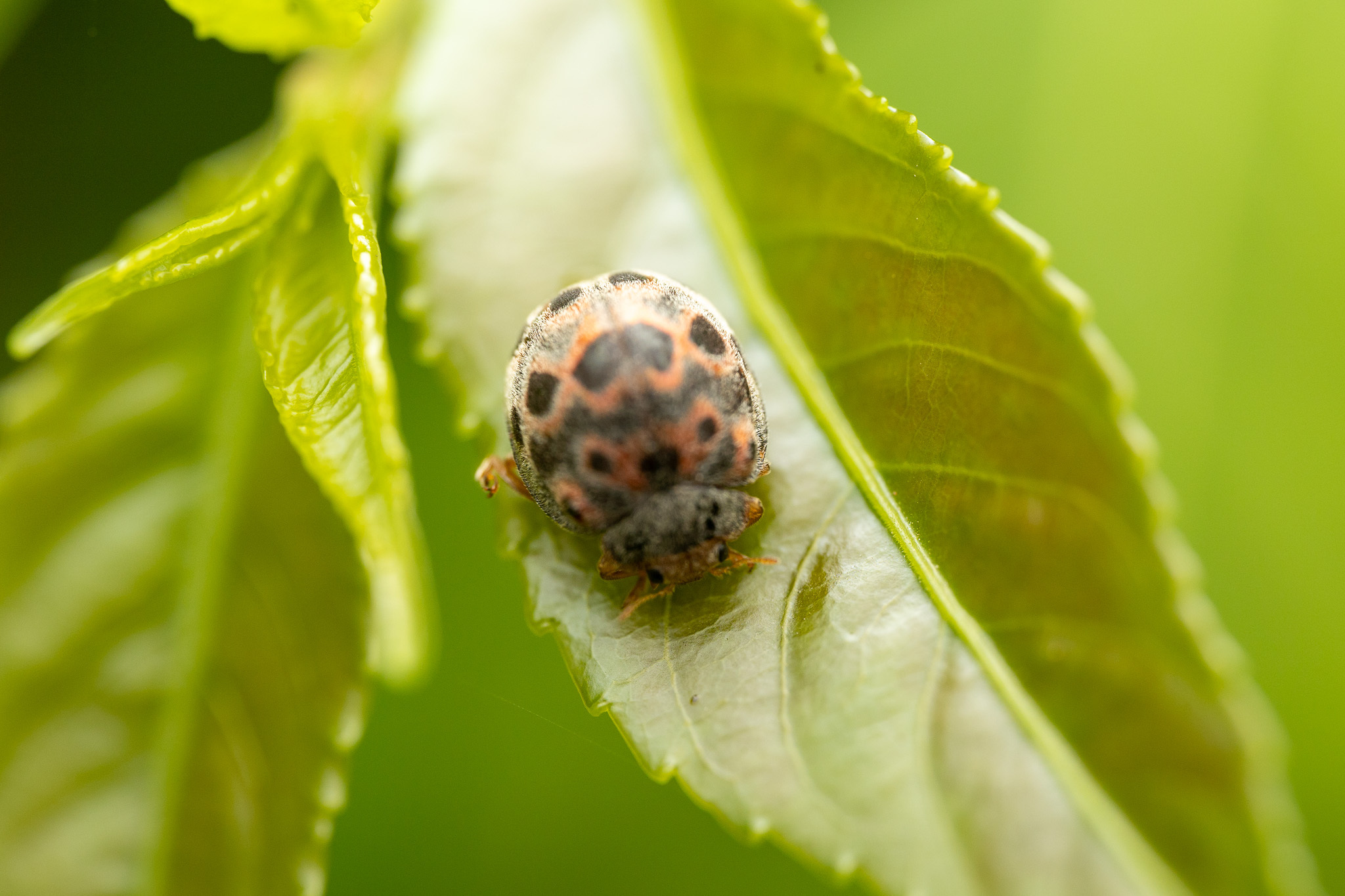

Scientific classification
- Kingdom: Animalia
- Phylum: Arthropoda
- Clade: Pancrustacea
- Class: Insecta
- Order: Coleoptera
- Suborder: Polyphaga
- Infraorder: Cucujiformia
- Family: Coccinellidae
- Genus: Epilachna
- Species: E. modesta

Binomial name
- Epilachna modesta Mulsant, 1850

= Epilachna modesta =

Species of beetle

Epilachna modesta is a species of beetle of the family Coccinellidae. It is found in Mexico.

== Description ==
Adults reach a length of about 5.47 mm. Adults are black. The anterior and lateral margins of the pronotum and the basal two-thirds of head are yellow and the elytron is black with eight piceous spots and orange bands.
