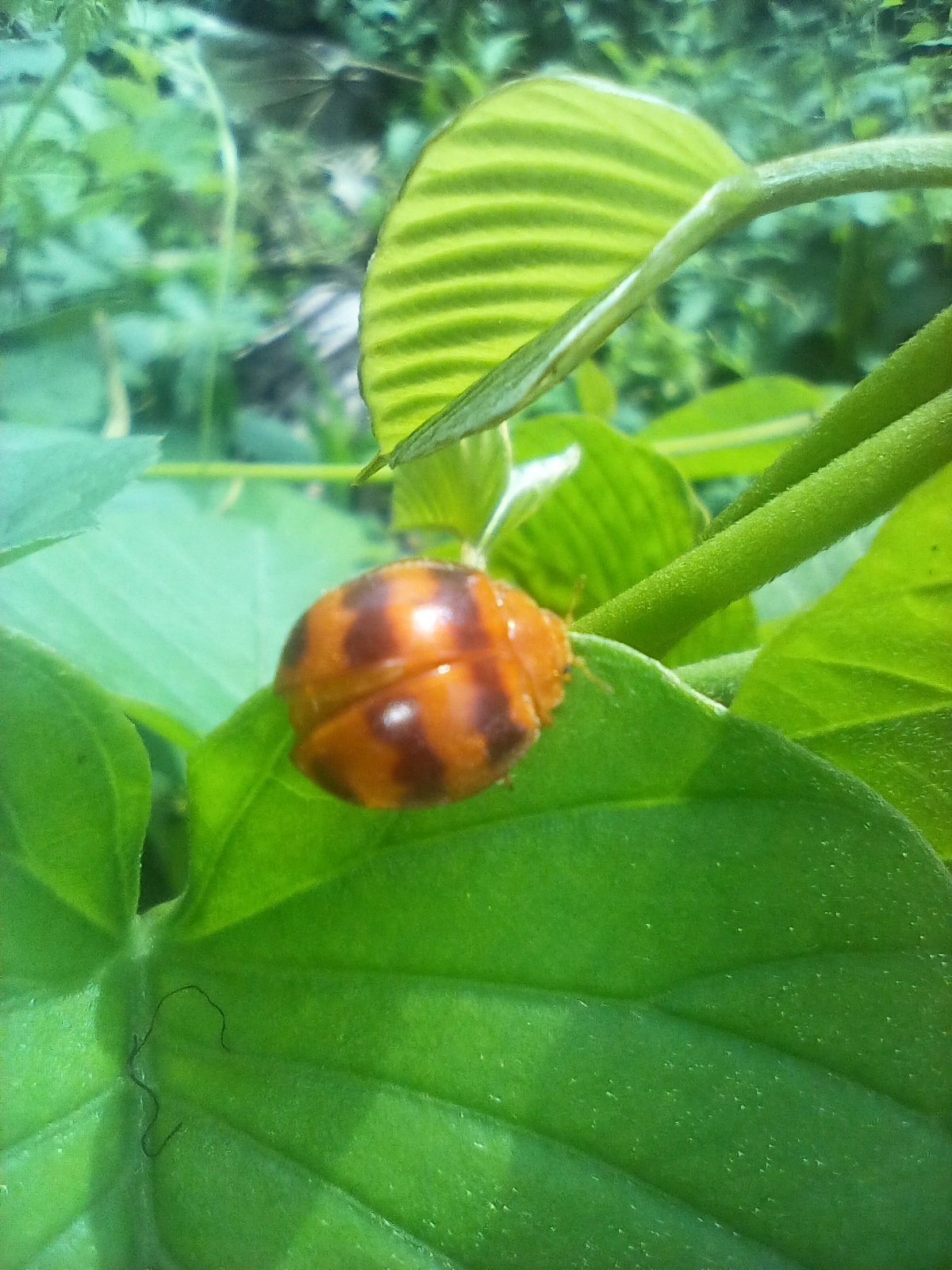

Scientific classification
- Kingdom: Animalia
- Phylum: Arthropoda
- Clade: Pancrustacea
- Class: Insecta
- Order: Coleoptera
- Suborder: Polyphaga
- Infraorder: Cucujiformia
- Family: Coccinellidae
- Genus: Epilachna
- Species: E. discincta

Binomial name
- Epilachna discincta Weise, 1890

= Epilachna discincta =

Species of beetle

Epilachna discincta is a species of beetle of the family Coccinellidae. It is found in Honduras, Guatemala and Mexico.

== Description ==
Adults reach a length of about 7-8.80 mm. Adults are yellowish red. The median area of the pronotum is piceous and the elytron is yellowish red with transverse bands and a large dark spot.
