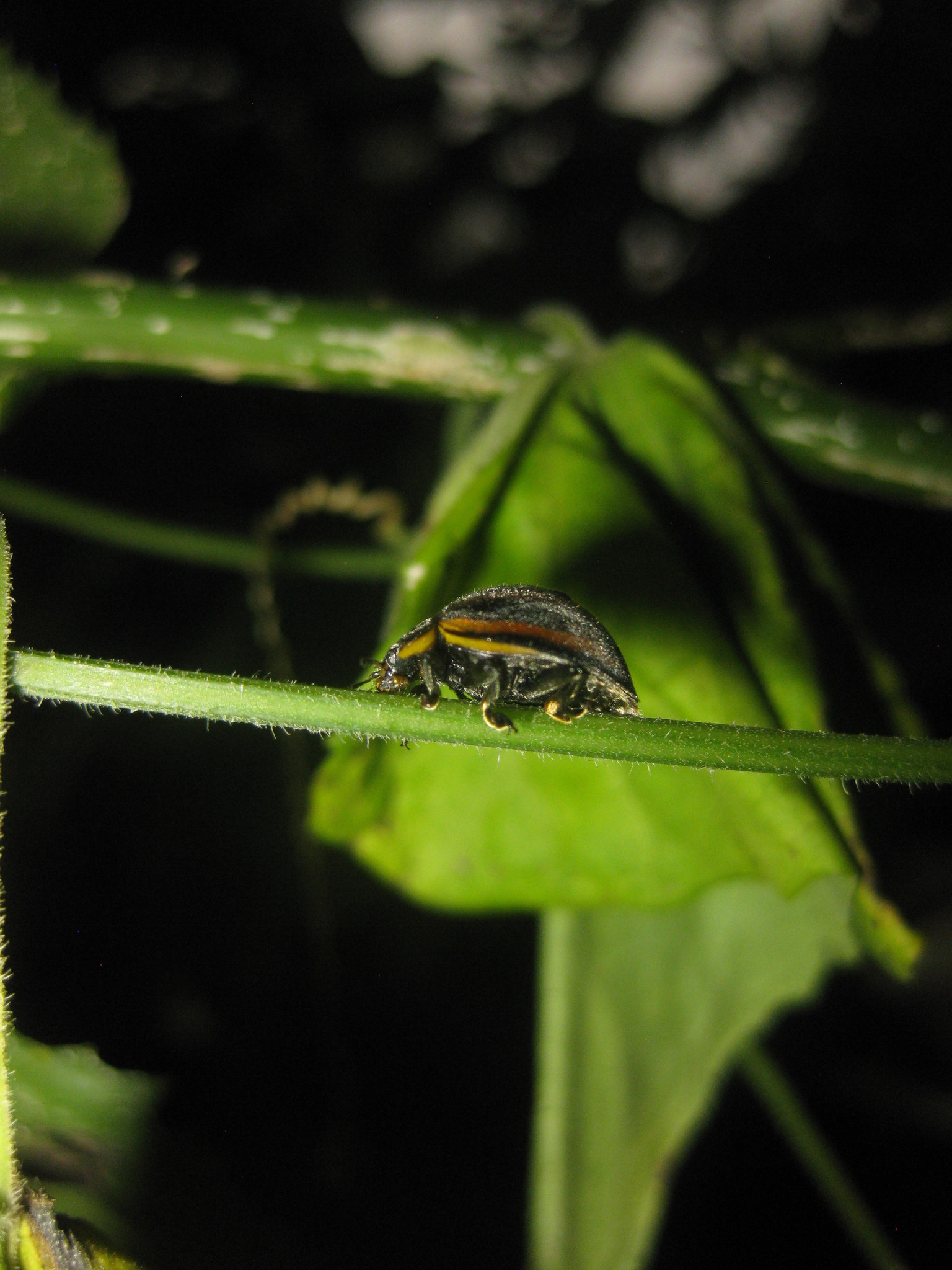

Scientific classification
- Kingdom: Animalia
- Phylum: Arthropoda
- Clade: Pancrustacea
- Class: Insecta
- Order: Coleoptera
- Suborder: Polyphaga
- Infraorder: Cucujiformia
- Family: Coccinellidae
- Genus: Epilachna
- Species: E. nigrovittata

Binomial name
- Epilachna nigrovittata Crotch, 1874

= Epilachna nigrovittata =

Species of beetle

Epilachna nigrovittata is a species of beetle of the family Coccinellidae. It is found in Ecuador.

== Description ==
Adults reach a length of about 8.50 mm. Adults are black. The anterolateral angle of the pronotum is yellow and the elytron is yellow with a black border and two black vittae.
