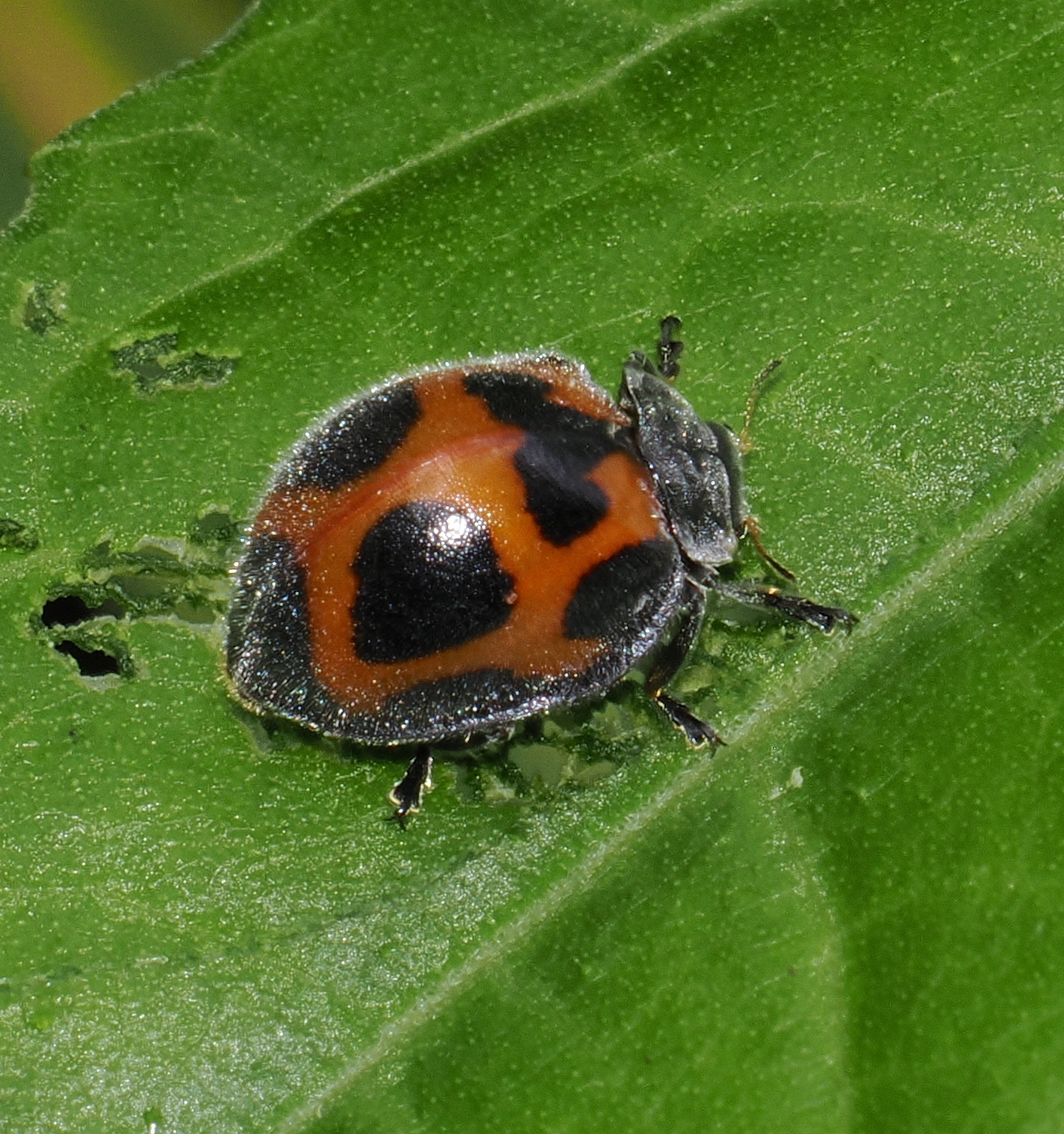

Scientific classification
- Kingdom: Animalia
- Phylum: Arthropoda
- Clade: Pancrustacea
- Class: Insecta
- Order: Coleoptera
- Suborder: Polyphaga
- Infraorder: Cucujiformia
- Family: Coccinellidae
- Genus: Epilachna
- Species: E. pictipennis

Binomial name
- Epilachna pictipennis Crotch, 1874

= Epilachna pictipennis =

Species of beetle

Epilachna pictipennis is a species of beetle of the family Coccinellidae. It is found in Colombia.

== Description ==
Adults reach a length of about 9-9.60 mm. Adults are black. The anterolateral angle of the pronotum is yellow and the elytron is yellowish orange with a black lateral margin and four black spots.
