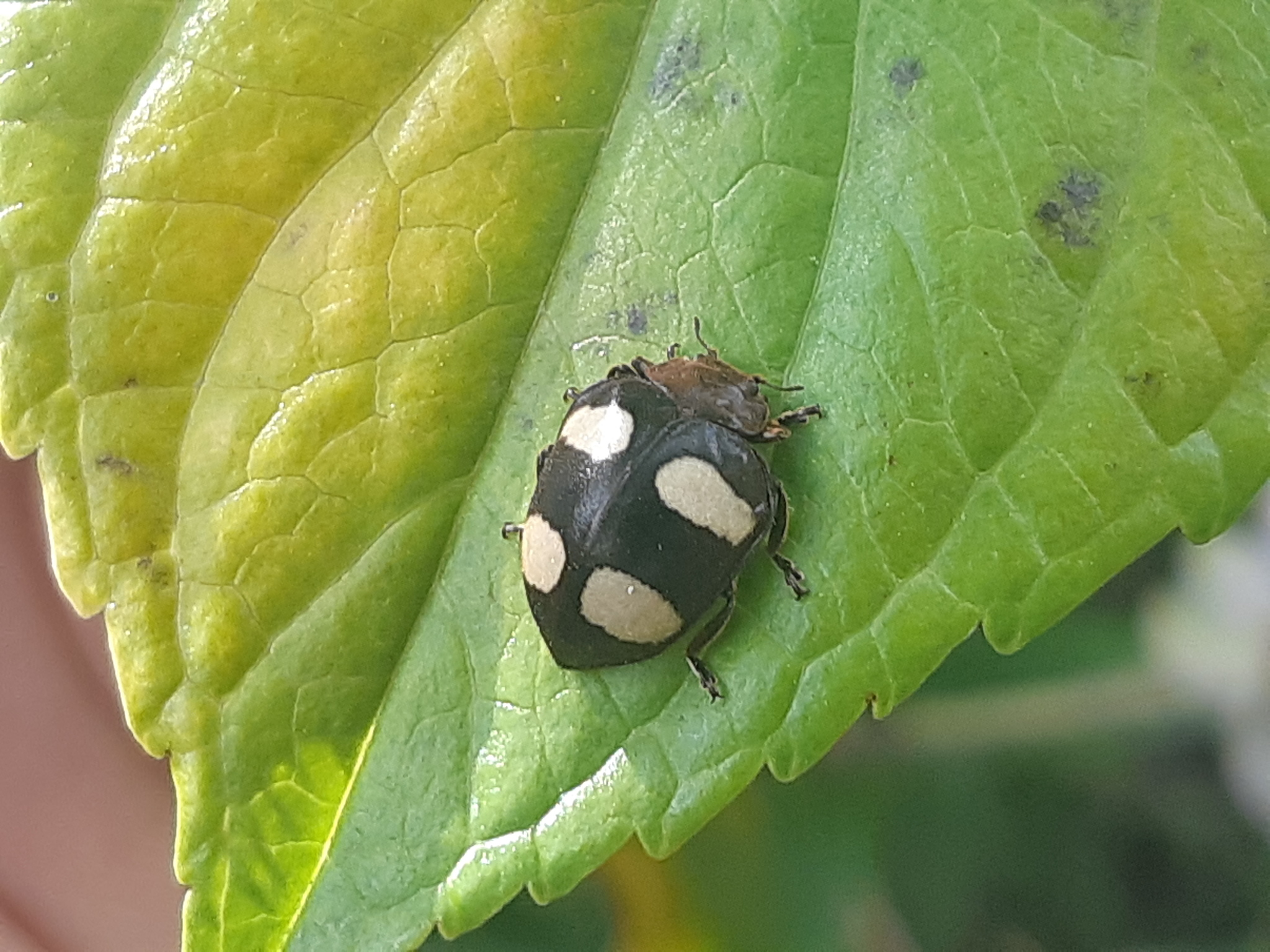

Scientific classification
- Kingdom: Animalia
- Phylum: Arthropoda
- Clade: Pancrustacea
- Class: Insecta
- Order: Coleoptera
- Suborder: Polyphaga
- Infraorder: Cucujiformia
- Family: Coccinellidae
- Genus: Epilachna
- Species: E. riveti

Binomial name
- Epilachna riveti (Sicard, 1910)

Synonyms
- Solanophila riveti Sicard, 1910

= Epilachna riveti =

Species of beetle

Epilachna riveti is a species of beetle of the family Coccinellidae. It is found in Ecuador.

== Description ==
Adults reach a length of about 7.10–10.21 mm. Adults are black. The elytron is black with two large yellow bands.
