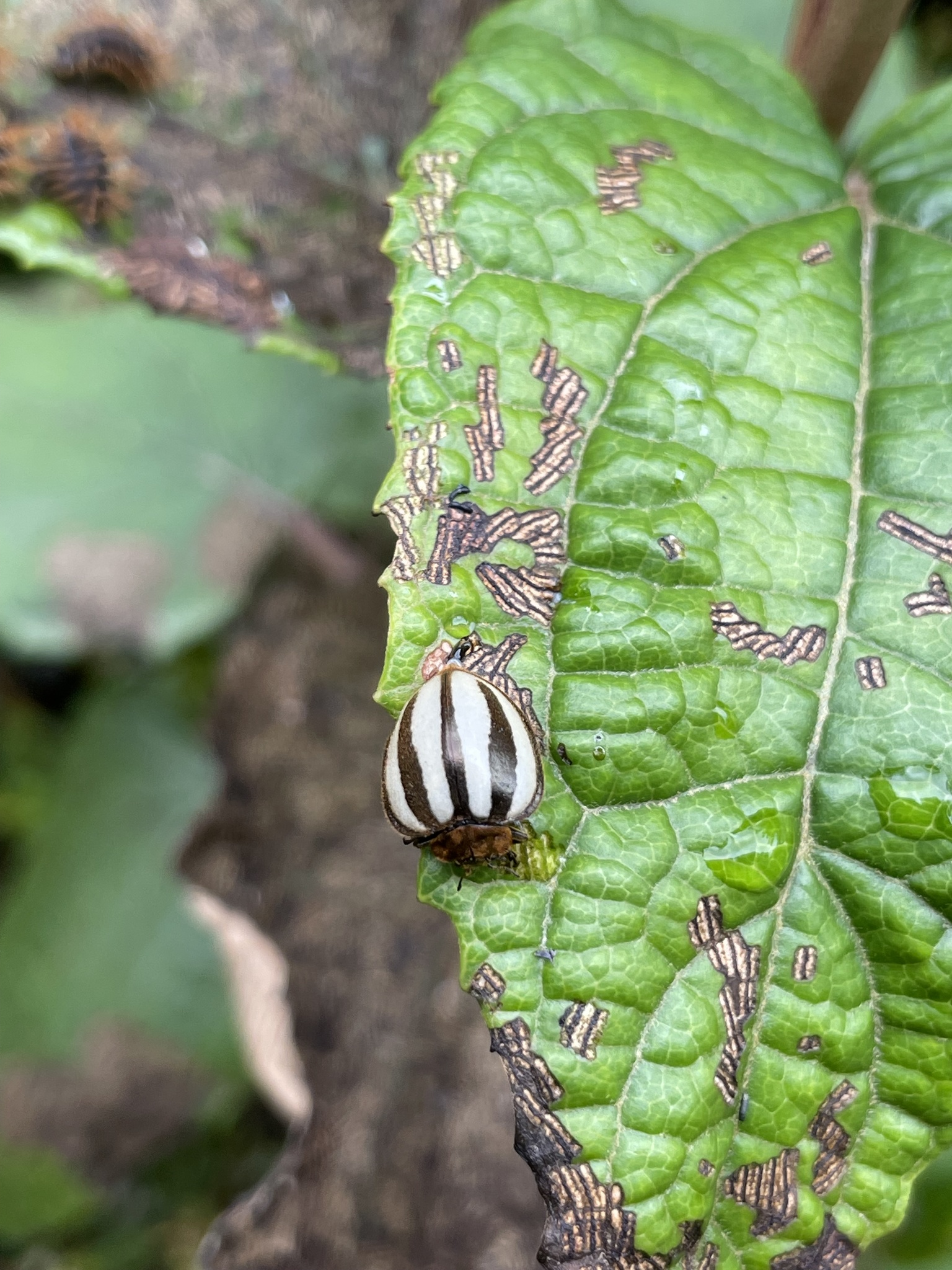

Scientific classification
- Kingdom: Animalia
- Phylum: Arthropoda
- Clade: Pancrustacea
- Class: Insecta
- Order: Coleoptera
- Suborder: Polyphaga
- Infraorder: Cucujiformia
- Family: Coccinellidae
- Genus: Epilachna
- Species: E. ecuadorica

Binomial name
- Epilachna ecuadorica Gordon, 1975

= Epilachna ecuadorica =

Species of beetle

Epilachna ecuadorica is a species of beetle of the family Coccinellidae. It is found in Ecuador.

== Description ==
Adults reach a length of about 8.95 mm. Adults are yellow. The elytron is yellow with a black border and a black vitta.
