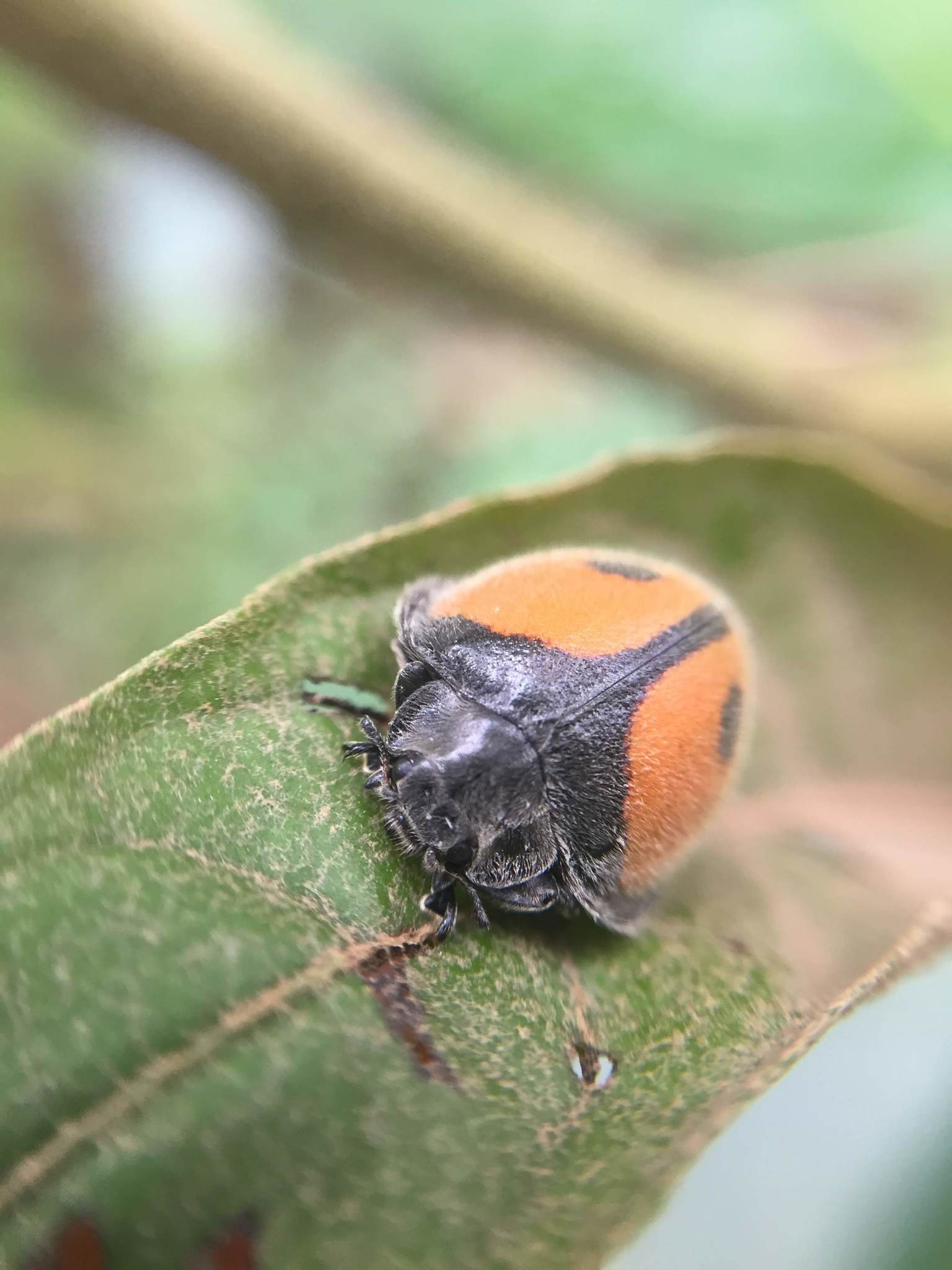

Scientific classification
- Kingdom: Animalia
- Phylum: Arthropoda
- Clade: Pancrustacea
- Class: Insecta
- Order: Coleoptera
- Suborder: Polyphaga
- Infraorder: Cucujiformia
- Family: Coccinellidae
- Genus: Epilachna
- Species: E. ovaloides

Binomial name
- Epilachna ovaloides Gordon, 1975

= Epilachna ovaloides =

Species of beetle

Epilachna ovaloides is a species of beetle of the family Coccinellidae. It is found in Colombia.

== Description ==
Adults reach a length of about 7.87–10.92 mm. Adults are black. The elytron is dark yellow bordered with black and with two black spots.
