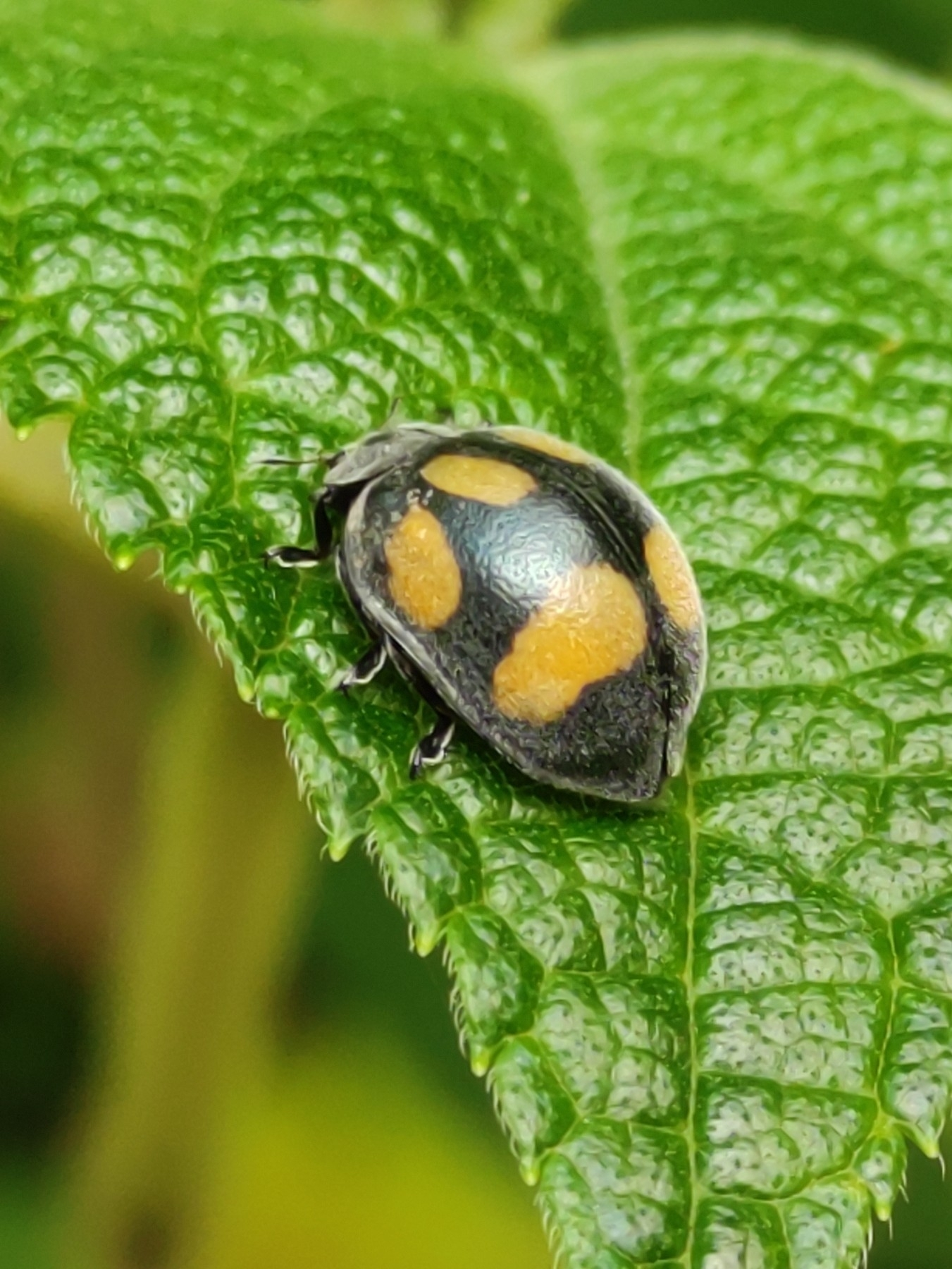

Scientific classification
- Kingdom: Animalia
- Phylum: Arthropoda
- Clade: Pancrustacea
- Class: Insecta
- Order: Coleoptera
- Suborder: Polyphaga
- Infraorder: Cucujiformia
- Family: Coccinellidae
- Genus: Epilachna
- Species: E. consularis

Binomial name
- Epilachna consularis Mulsant, 1850

= Epilachna consularis =

Species of beetle

Epilachna consularis is a species of beetle of the family Coccinellidae. It is found in Colombia and Ecuador.

== Description ==
Adults reach a length of about 10.46–12.10 mm. Adults are black. The elytron is bluish black with three yellow spots.
