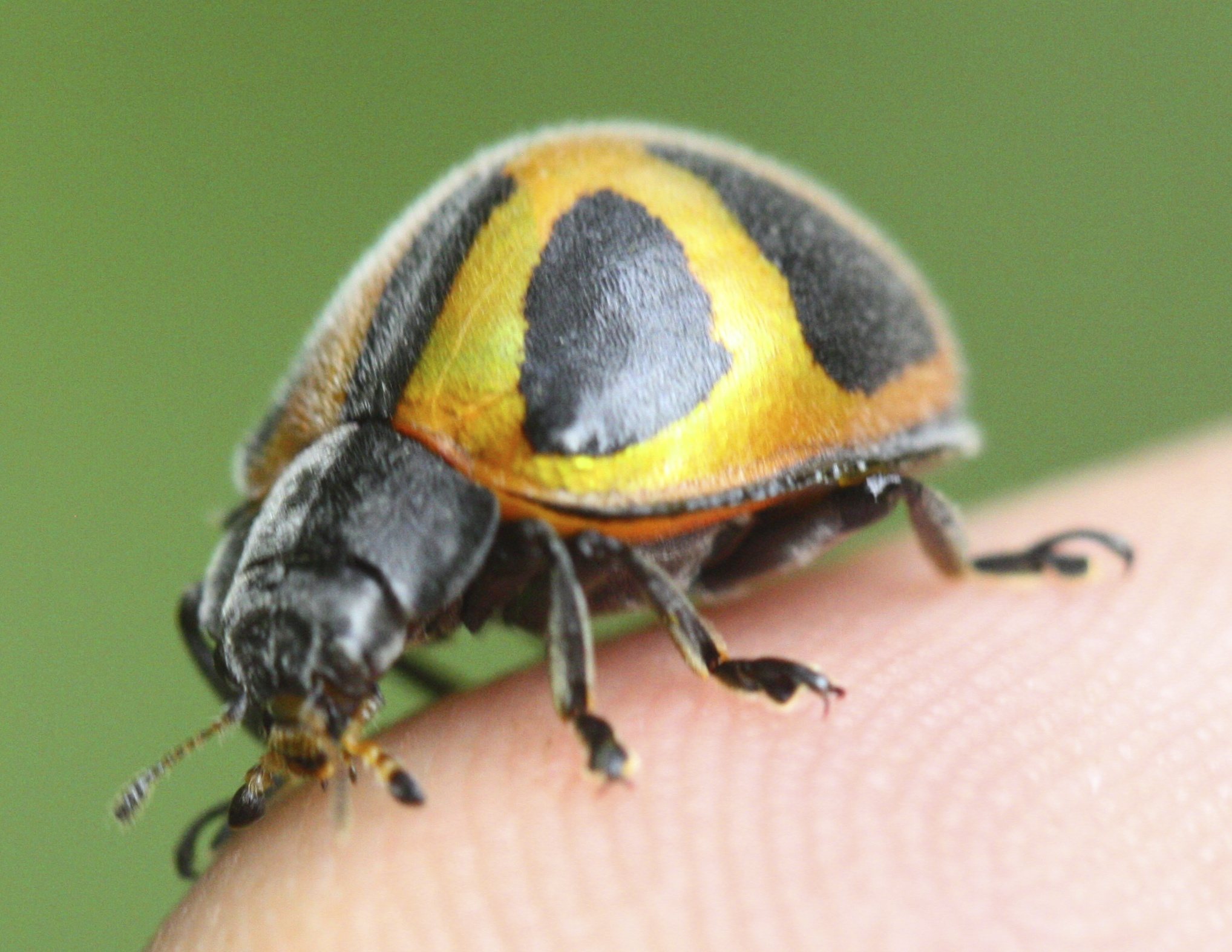

Scientific classification
- Kingdom: Animalia
- Phylum: Arthropoda
- Clade: Pancrustacea
- Class: Insecta
- Order: Coleoptera
- Suborder: Polyphaga
- Infraorder: Cucujiformia
- Family: Coccinellidae
- Genus: Epilachna
- Species: E. radiata

Binomial name
- Epilachna radiata (Guérin-Méneville, 1844)

Synonyms
- Coccinella radiata Guérin-Méneville, 1844

= Epilachna radiata =

Species of beetle

Epilachna radiata is a species of beetle of the family Coccinellidae. It is found in Colombia.

== Description ==
Adults reach a length of about 9.50–11.15 mm. Adults are black. The anterolateral angle of the pronotum is yellow and the elytron is yellow with a black lateral margin and four black spots.
