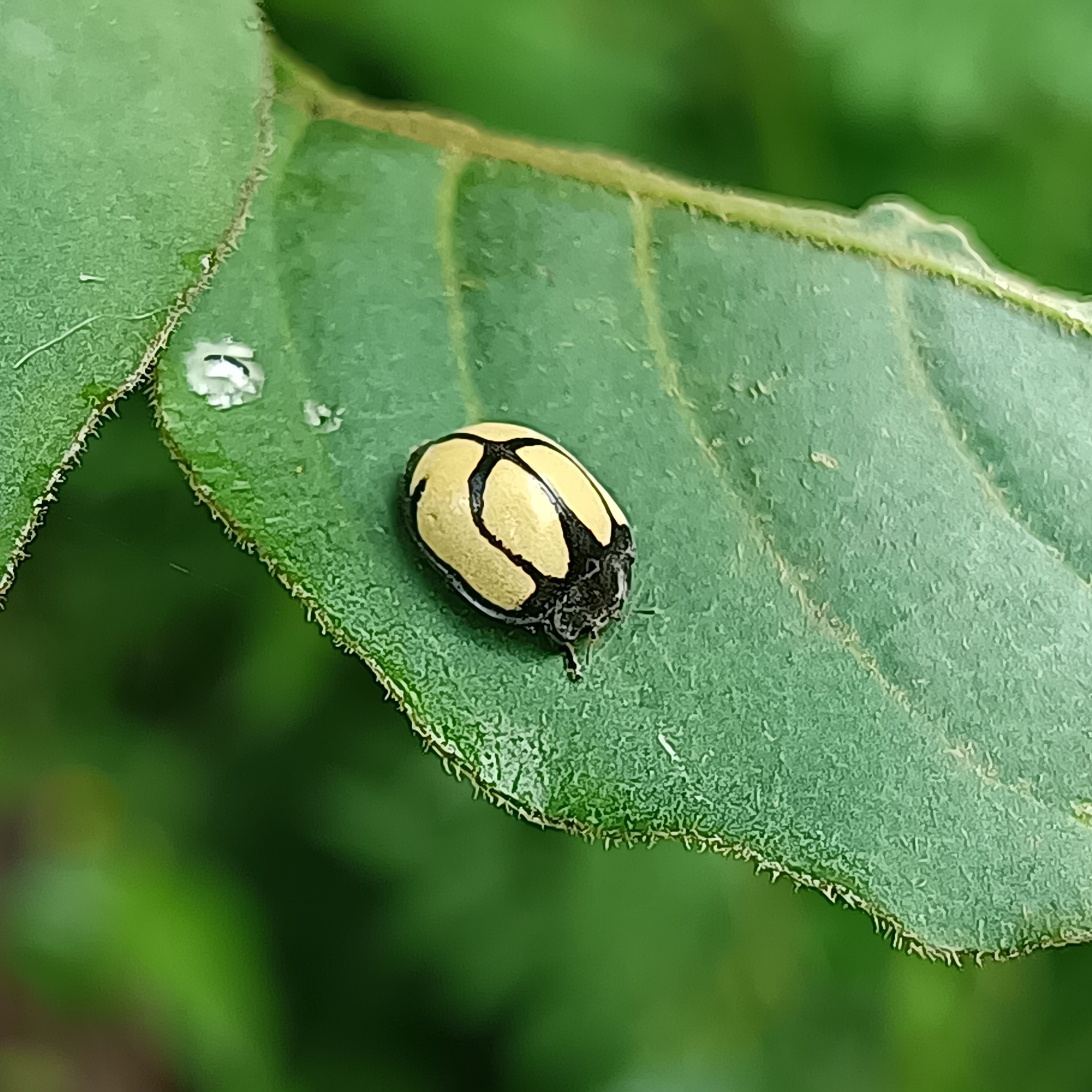

Scientific classification
- Kingdom: Animalia
- Phylum: Arthropoda
- Clade: Pancrustacea
- Class: Insecta
- Order: Coleoptera
- Suborder: Polyphaga
- Infraorder: Cucujiformia
- Family: Coccinellidae
- Genus: Epilachna
- Species: E. nigrocincta

Binomial name
- Epilachna nigrocincta Mulsant, 1850

= Epilachna nigrocincta =

Species of beetle

Epilachna nigrocincta is a species of beetle of the family Coccinellidae. It is found in Mexico and Guatemala.

== Description ==
Adults reach a length of about 6-8.75 mm. Adults are black. The elytron is yellow with a black border.
