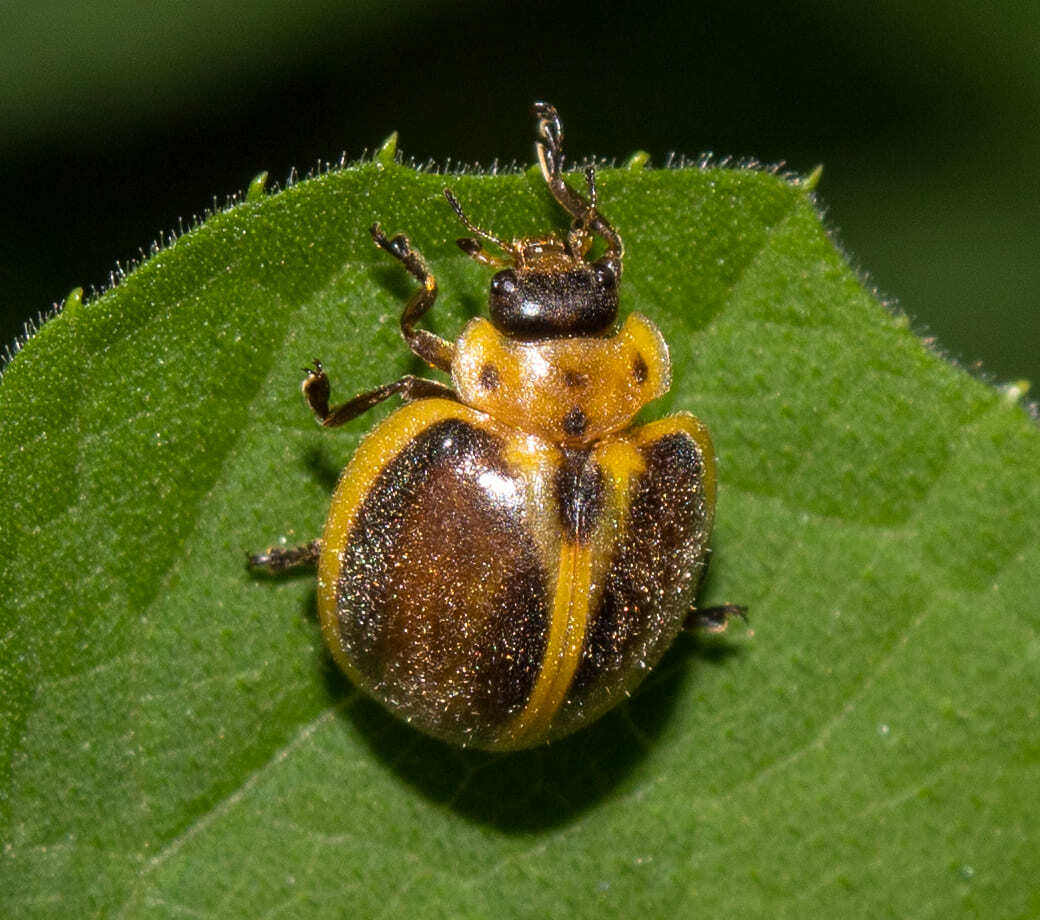

Scientific classification
- Kingdom: Animalia
- Phylum: Arthropoda
- Clade: Pancrustacea
- Class: Insecta
- Order: Coleoptera
- Suborder: Polyphaga
- Infraorder: Cucujiformia
- Family: Coccinellidae
- Genus: Epilachna
- Species: E. clandestina

Binomial name
- Epilachna clandestina Mulsant, 1850

= Epilachna clandestina =

Species of beetle

Epilachna clandestina is a species of beetle of the family Coccinellidae. It is found in Brazil.

== Description ==
Adults reach a length of about 6.68–9 mm. Adults are piceous to yellowish brown. The pronotum is yellow with four piceous spots and the elytron is piceous bordered with yellow.
