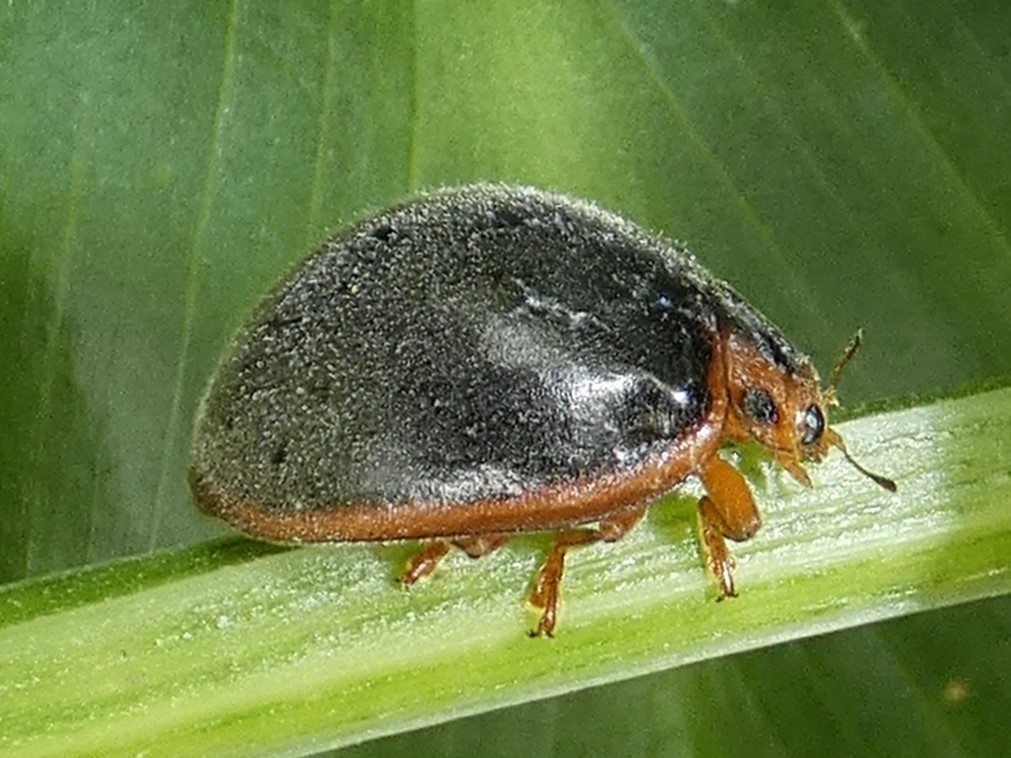
- Epilachna kraussi

Scientific classification
- Kingdom: Animalia
- Phylum: Arthropoda
- Clade: Pancrustacea
- Class: Insecta
- Order: Coleoptera
- Suborder: Polyphaga
- Infraorder: Cucujiformia
- Family: Coccinellidae
- Genus: Epilachna
- Species: E. kraussi

Binomial name
- Epilachna kraussi Gordon, 1975

= Epilachna kraussi =

Species of beetle

Epilachna kraussi is a species of beetle in the family Coccinellidae. It is found in Panama and Colombia.

== Description ==
Adults reach a length of about 9.45–11 mm. Adults are brownish yellow. The pronotum has two lateral spots and one median black spot. The elytron is black with reddish brown basal margin and yellow apical margin.
