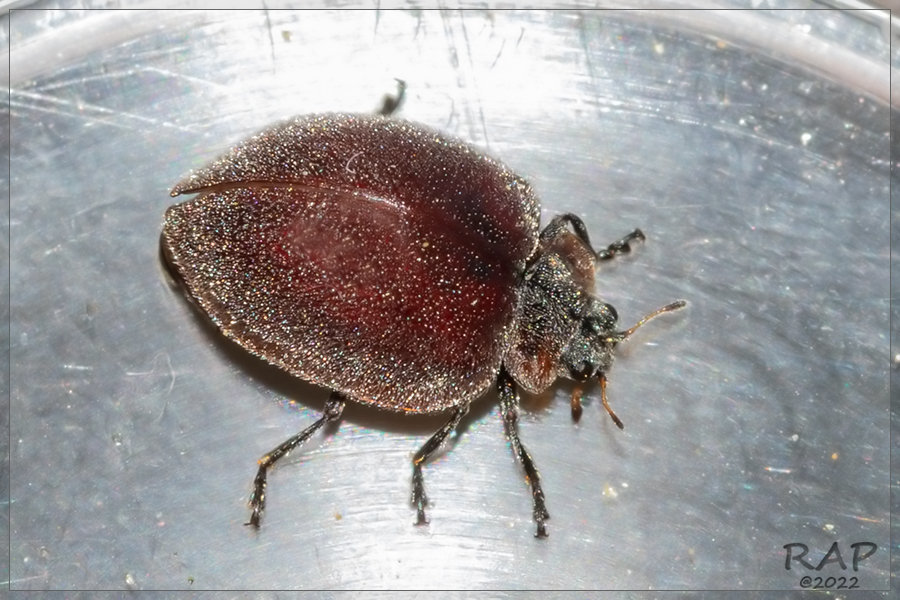

Scientific classification
- Kingdom: Animalia
- Phylum: Arthropoda
- Clade: Pancrustacea
- Class: Insecta
- Order: Coleoptera
- Suborder: Polyphaga
- Infraorder: Cucujiformia
- Family: Coccinellidae
- Genus: Epilachna
- Species: E. punctatissima

Binomial name
- Epilachna punctatissima (Weise, 1904)

Synonyms
- Solanophila punctatissima Weise, 1904

= Epilachna punctatissima =

Species of beetle

Epilachna punctatissima is a species of beetle of the family Coccinellidae. It is found in Argentina.

== Description ==
Adults reach a length of about 5-5.95 mm. Adults are black, while the elytron is reddish brown.
