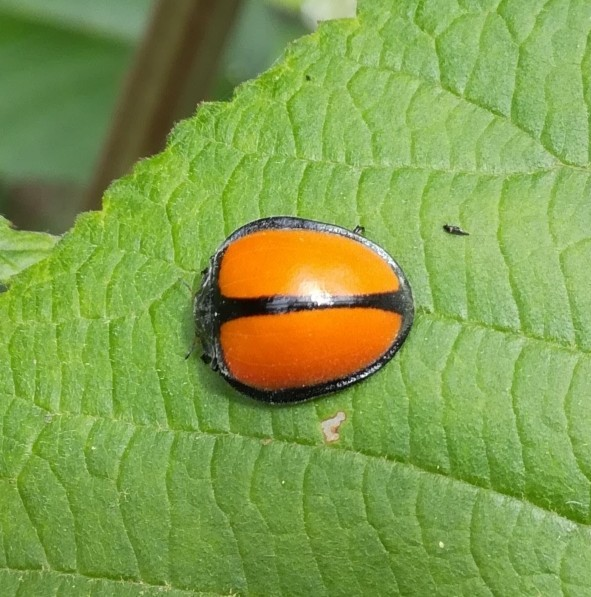

Scientific classification
- Kingdom: Animalia
- Phylum: Arthropoda
- Clade: Pancrustacea
- Class: Insecta
- Order: Coleoptera
- Suborder: Polyphaga
- Infraorder: Cucujiformia
- Family: Coccinellidae
- Genus: Epilachna
- Species: E. abrupta

Binomial name
- Epilachna abrupta Gorham, 1899

= Epilachna abrupta =

Species of beetle

Epilachna abrupta is a species of beetle of the family Coccinellidae. It is found in Costa Rica and Panama.

== Description ==
Adults reach a length of about 9.42–12.05 mm. Adults are black. The elytron is light yellow with a black border.
