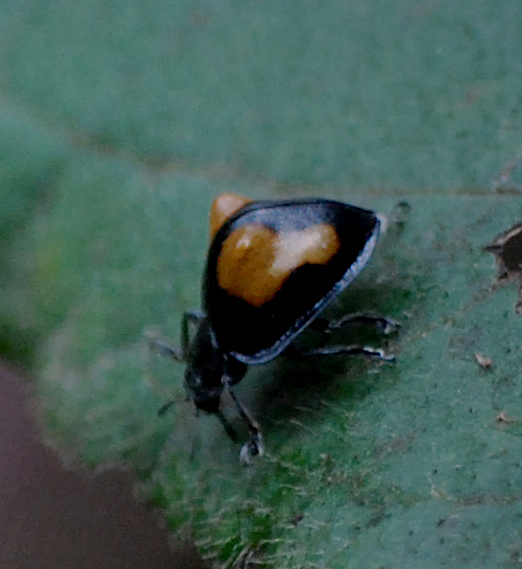

Scientific classification
- Kingdom: Animalia
- Phylum: Arthropoda
- Clade: Pancrustacea
- Class: Insecta
- Order: Coleoptera
- Suborder: Polyphaga
- Infraorder: Cucujiformia
- Family: Coccinellidae
- Genus: Epilachna
- Species: E. bituberculata

Binomial name
- Epilachna bituberculata Waterhouse, 1879

Synonyms
- Epilachna pustulifera Gorham, 1899

= Epilachna bituberculata =

Species of beetle

Epilachna bituberculata is a species of beetle of the family Coccinellidae. It is found in Colombia.

== Description ==
Adults reach a length of about 7.13 mm. Adults are black. The anterolateral angle of the pronotum is yellow and the elytron is black with a red spot on the disk and a blood-red rounded tubercle on the disk.
