= Epilachna bolivicola =

Scientific classification
- Kingdom: Animalia
- Phylum: Arthropoda
- Clade: Pancrustacea
- Class: Insecta
- Order: Coleoptera
- Suborder: Polyphaga
- Infraorder: Cucujiformia
- Family: Coccinellidae
- Genus: Epilachna
- Species: E. bolivicola

Binomial name
- Epilachna bolivicola (Mader, 1950)

Synonyms
- Solanophila bolivicola Mader, 1950

Species of beetle

Epilachna bolivicola is a species of beetle of the family Coccinellidae. It is found in Bolivia.

== Description ==
Adults reach a length of about 5.86 mm. Adults are black. The anterolateral angle of the pronotum is yellow and the colour pattern of the elytron is the same as that of Epilachna harringtoni.
