= Epilachna pachiteensis =

Scientific classification
- Kingdom: Animalia
- Phylum: Arthropoda
- Clade: Pancrustacea
- Class: Insecta
- Order: Coleoptera
- Suborder: Polyphaga
- Infraorder: Cucujiformia
- Family: Coccinellidae
- Genus: Epilachna
- Species: E. pachiteensis

Binomial name
- Epilachna pachiteensis (Weise, 1926)

Synonyms
- Solanophila pachiteensis Weise, 1926

Species of beetle

Epilachna pachiteensis is a species of beetle of the family Coccinellidae. It is found in Peru.

== Description ==
Adults reach a length of about 11.76–12.10 mm. Adults are similar to Epilachna mutabilis, but the elytron has four yellow spots.
