= Epilachna mutabilis =

Scientific classification
- Kingdom: Animalia
- Phylum: Arthropoda
- Clade: Pancrustacea
- Class: Insecta
- Order: Coleoptera
- Suborder: Polyphaga
- Infraorder: Cucujiformia
- Family: Coccinellidae
- Genus: Epilachna
- Species: E. mutabilis

Binomial name
- Epilachna mutabilis Crotch, 1874

Species of beetle

Epilachna mutabilis is a species of beetle of the family Coccinellidae. It is found in Ecuador and Peru.

== Description ==
Adults reach a length of about 9.33–11.81 mm. Adults are black. The anterolateral angle of the pronotum is brownish yellow and the elytron is black with three brownish-yellow spots.
