= Epilachna mandibularis =

Scientific classification
- Kingdom: Animalia
- Phylum: Arthropoda
- Clade: Pancrustacea
- Class: Insecta
- Order: Coleoptera
- Suborder: Polyphaga
- Infraorder: Cucujiformia
- Family: Coccinellidae
- Genus: Epilachna
- Species: E. mandibularis

Binomial name
- Epilachna mandibularis Gordon, 1975

Species of beetle

Epilachna mandibularis is a species of beetle of the family Coccinellidae. It is found in Peru.

== Description ==
Adults reach a length of about 8 mm. Adults are similar to Epilachna basalis, but the anterolateral angle of the pronotum is yellow and the lateral and basal margins of the elytron are bordered with black.
