= Epilachna basalis =

Scientific classification
- Kingdom: Animalia
- Phylum: Arthropoda
- Clade: Pancrustacea
- Class: Insecta
- Order: Coleoptera
- Suborder: Polyphaga
- Infraorder: Cucujiformia
- Family: Coccinellidae
- Genus: Epilachna
- Species: E. basalis

Binomial name
- Epilachna basalis (Weise, 1900)

Synonyms
- Solanophila basalis Weise, 1900

Species of beetle

Epilachna basalis is a species of beetle of the family Coccinellidae. It is found in Peru.

== Description ==
Adults reach a length of about 7.63–8.44 mm. Adults are black. The lateral margin of the pronotum is yellow and the elytron is yellowish brown, the sutural margin with a black border.
