= Epilachna axillaris =

Scientific classification
- Kingdom: Animalia
- Phylum: Arthropoda
- Clade: Pancrustacea
- Class: Insecta
- Order: Coleoptera
- Suborder: Polyphaga
- Infraorder: Cucujiformia
- Family: Coccinellidae
- Genus: Epilachna
- Species: E. axillaris

Binomial name
- Epilachna axillaris Mulsant, 1850

Species of beetle

Epilachna axillaris is a species of beetle of the family Coccinellidae. It is found in Colombia and Venezuela.

== Description ==
Adults reach a length of about 11.50 mm. Adults are similar to Epilachna stolata, but there is a black band on the elytron.
