= Epilachna stolata =

Scientific classification
- Kingdom: Animalia
- Phylum: Arthropoda
- Clade: Pancrustacea
- Class: Insecta
- Order: Coleoptera
- Suborder: Polyphaga
- Infraorder: Cucujiformia
- Family: Coccinellidae
- Genus: Epilachna
- Species: E. stolata

Binomial name
- Epilachna stolata Mulsant, 1850

Synonyms
- Epilachna scapularis Mulsant, 1850

Species of beetle

Epilachna stolata is a species of beetle of the family Coccinellidae. It is found in Colombia and Venezuela.

== Description ==
Adults reach a length of about 9.60–11 mm. Adults are black. The anterolateral angle of the pronotum is yellow and the elytron is brownish red with black margins and a black vitta.
