= Epilachna honesta =

Scientific classification
- Kingdom: Animalia
- Phylum: Arthropoda
- Clade: Pancrustacea
- Class: Insecta
- Order: Coleoptera
- Suborder: Polyphaga
- Infraorder: Cucujiformia
- Family: Coccinellidae
- Genus: Epilachna
- Species: E. honesta

Binomial name
- Epilachna honesta (Weise, 1900)

Synonyms
- Solanophila honesta Weise, 1900

Species of beetle

Epilachna honesta is a species of beetle of the family Coccinellidae. It is found in Peru.

== Description ==
Adults reach a length of about 6.03–6.98 mm. Adults are similar to Epilachna discoidea, but the orange discal spot is larger.
