= Epilachna vittigera =

Scientific classification
- Kingdom: Animalia
- Phylum: Arthropoda
- Clade: Pancrustacea
- Class: Insecta
- Order: Coleoptera
- Suborder: Polyphaga
- Infraorder: Cucujiformia
- Family: Coccinellidae
- Genus: Epilachna
- Species: E. vittigera

Binomial name
- Epilachna vittigera (Crotch, 1874)

Synonyms
- Epilachna v-pallidum var. vittigera Crotch, 1874; Solanophila graphis Weise, 1905; Solanophila crotchi Sicard, 1912; Solanophila bisbilineata Weise, 1926

Species of beetle

Epilachna vittigera is a species of beetle of the family Coccinellidae. It is found in Bolivia and Peru.

== Description ==
Adults reach a length of about 5.70–7 mm. Adults are black. The elytron is yellow with a black border. The elytron is divided into three areas by a black vitta and a band.
