= Epilachna viridilineata =

Scientific classification
- Kingdom: Animalia
- Phylum: Arthropoda
- Clade: Pancrustacea
- Class: Insecta
- Order: Coleoptera
- Suborder: Polyphaga
- Infraorder: Cucujiformia
- Family: Coccinellidae
- Genus: Epilachna
- Species: E. viridilineata

Binomial name
- Epilachna viridilineata Crotch, 1874

Species of beetle

Epilachna viridilineata is a species of beetle of the family Coccinellidae. It is found in Ecuador and Peru.

== Description ==
Adults reach a length of about 7-9.35 mm. Adults are black. The elytron is yellow with a greenish black margin. The elytron is divided into four areas.

== Subspecies ==
- Epilachna viridilineata viridilineata (Ecuador, Peru)
- Epilachna viridilineata rossi Gordon, 1975 (Ecuador)
