= Epilachna bonplandi =

Scientific classification
- Kingdom: Animalia
- Phylum: Arthropoda
- Clade: Pancrustacea
- Class: Insecta
- Order: Coleoptera
- Suborder: Polyphaga
- Infraorder: Cucujiformia
- Family: Coccinellidae
- Genus: Epilachna
- Species: E. bonplandi

Binomial name
- Epilachna bonplandi Dejean, 1837

Synonyms
- Coccinella quadriplagiata Latreille, 1809 (nec Swartz in Schönherr, 1808); Epilachna acuminata Mulsant, 1853

Species of beetle

Epilachna bonplandi is a species of beetle of the family Coccinellidae. It is found in Colombia and Peru.

== Description ==
Adults reach a length of about 6.44 mm. Adults are black. The anterolateral angle of the pronotum is yellow and the elytron is black with two large orange spots.
