= Epilachna gordoni =

Scientific classification
- Kingdom: Animalia
- Phylum: Arthropoda
- Clade: Pancrustacea
- Class: Insecta
- Order: Coleoptera
- Suborder: Polyphaga
- Infraorder: Cucujiformia
- Family: Coccinellidae
- Genus: Epilachna
- Species: E. gordoni

Binomial name
- Epilachna gordoni Jadwiszczak & Węgrzynowicz, 2003

Synonyms
- Epilachna korschefskyi Gordon, 1975 (preocc.)

Species of beetle

Epilachna gordoni is a species of beetle of the family Coccinellidae. It is found in Ecuador.

== Description ==
Adults reach a length of about 6 mm. Adults are dark brown. The lateral and apical margins of the pronotum are yellowish brown and the elytron is dark brown with two large yellow spots and a yellow vitta.
