= Epilachna ostensa =

Scientific classification
- Kingdom: Animalia
- Phylum: Arthropoda
- Clade: Pancrustacea
- Class: Insecta
- Order: Coleoptera
- Suborder: Polyphaga
- Infraorder: Cucujiformia
- Family: Coccinellidae
- Genus: Epilachna
- Species: E. ostensa

Binomial name
- Epilachna ostensa (Weise, 1902)

Synonyms
- Solanophila ostensa Weise, 1902

Species of beetle

Epilachna ostensa is a species of beetle of the family Coccinellidae. It is found in Bolivia and Peru.

== Description ==
Adults reach a length of about 5.93–6.50 mm. Adults are dark brown. The anterolateral margin of the pronotum is yellow and the elytron is yellow with a black border, a median black vitta, a transverse band and a round black spot on the apical one-third.
