= Epilachna cordula =

Scientific classification
- Kingdom: Animalia
- Phylum: Arthropoda
- Clade: Pancrustacea
- Class: Insecta
- Order: Coleoptera
- Suborder: Polyphaga
- Infraorder: Cucujiformia
- Family: Coccinellidae
- Genus: Epilachna
- Species: E. cordula

Binomial name
- Epilachna cordula (Weise, 1898)

Synonyms
- Solanophila cordula Weise, 1898

Species of beetle

Epilachna cordula is a species of beetle of the family Coccinellidae. It is found in Colombia.

== Description ==
Adults reach a length of about 8.75–9 mm. Adults are piceous to black. The lateral margin of the pronotum is piceous, while the anterolateral angle is paler. The elytron is yellow, while the basal one-third and lateral margin are black. There are also three black spots.
