= Epilachna ignobilis =

Scientific classification
- Kingdom: Animalia
- Phylum: Arthropoda
- Clade: Pancrustacea
- Class: Insecta
- Order: Coleoptera
- Suborder: Polyphaga
- Infraorder: Cucujiformia
- Family: Coccinellidae
- Genus: Epilachna
- Species: E. ignobilis

Binomial name
- Epilachna ignobilis (Weise, 1902)

Synonyms
- Solanophila ignobilis Weise, 1902

Species of beetle

Epilachna ignobilis is a species of beetle of the family Coccinellidae. It is found in Peru.

== Description ==
Adults reach a length of about 5.81–7.01 mm. Adults are black. The anterolateral angle of the pronotum is yellow and the elytron is brownish red with a black basal and lateral margin and a black vitta.
