= Epilachna sexlineata =

Scientific classification
- Kingdom: Animalia
- Phylum: Arthropoda
- Clade: Pancrustacea
- Class: Insecta
- Order: Coleoptera
- Suborder: Polyphaga
- Infraorder: Cucujiformia
- Family: Coccinellidae
- Genus: Epilachna
- Species: E. sexlineata

Binomial name
- Epilachna sexlineata (Weise, 1898)

Synonyms
- Solanophila sexlineata Weise, 1898

Species of beetle

Epilachna sexlineata is a species of beetle of the family Coccinellidae. It is found in Bolivia.

== Description ==
Adults reach a length of about 7.50 mm. Adults are black. The anterolateral angle of the pronotum is yellow and the elytron is yellowish orange with a black margin and three vittae.
