= Epilachna adnexa =

Scientific classification
- Kingdom: Animalia
- Phylum: Arthropoda
- Clade: Pancrustacea
- Class: Insecta
- Order: Coleoptera
- Suborder: Polyphaga
- Infraorder: Cucujiformia
- Family: Coccinellidae
- Genus: Epilachna
- Species: E. adnexa

Binomial name
- Epilachna adnexa (Mader, 1958)

Synonyms
- Solanophila adnexa Mader, 1958

Species of beetle

Epilachna adnexa is a species of beetle of the family Coccinellidae. It is found in Bolivia.

== Description ==
Adults reach a length of about 6.43 mm. Adults are dark brown. The anterolateral margin of the pronotum is yellow and the elytron is black with two large yellow spots separated by a black band.
