= Epilachna sztolcmani =

Scientific classification
- Kingdom: Animalia
- Phylum: Arthropoda
- Clade: Pancrustacea
- Class: Insecta
- Order: Coleoptera
- Suborder: Polyphaga
- Infraorder: Cucujiformia
- Family: Coccinellidae
- Genus: Epilachna
- Species: E. sztolcmani

Binomial name
- Epilachna sztolcmani Jadwiszczak & Węgrzynowicz, 2003

Synonyms
- Epilachna simplex Gordon, 1975 (preocc.)

Species of beetle

Epilachna sztolcmani is a species of beetle of the family Coccinellidae. It is found in Peru.

== Description ==
Adults reach a length of about 6-7.20 mm. Adults are black. The elytron is black with two yellow spots.
