= Epilachna holmgreni =

Scientific classification
- Kingdom: Animalia
- Phylum: Arthropoda
- Clade: Pancrustacea
- Class: Insecta
- Order: Coleoptera
- Suborder: Polyphaga
- Infraorder: Cucujiformia
- Family: Coccinellidae
- Genus: Epilachna
- Species: E. holmgreni

Binomial name
- Epilachna holmgreni (Weise, 1926)

Synonyms
- Solanophila holmgreni Weise, 1926

Species of beetle

Epilachna holmgreni is a species of beetle of the family Coccinellidae. It is found in Bolivia.

== Description ==
Adults reach a length of about 9.83 mm. Adults are black. The anterolateral angle of the pronotum is reddish piceous and the elytron is black with two yellow spots.
