= Epilachna vanpatteni =

Scientific classification
- Kingdom: Animalia
- Phylum: Arthropoda
- Clade: Pancrustacea
- Class: Insecta
- Order: Coleoptera
- Suborder: Polyphaga
- Infraorder: Cucujiformia
- Family: Coccinellidae
- Genus: Epilachna
- Species: E. vanpatteni

Binomial name
- Epilachna vanpatteni Gorham, 1899

Species of beetle

Epilachna vanpatteni is a species of beetle of the family Coccinellidae. It is found in Costa Rica and Guatemala.

== Description ==
Adults reach a length of about 6.10–7 mm. Adults are yellow. The pronotum has small black lateral spots and the elytron is yellow with a pale yellow lateral margin and ten black spots and a transverse band.
