= Epilachna merae =

Scientific classification
- Kingdom: Animalia
- Phylum: Arthropoda
- Clade: Pancrustacea
- Class: Insecta
- Order: Coleoptera
- Suborder: Polyphaga
- Infraorder: Cucujiformia
- Family: Coccinellidae
- Genus: Epilachna
- Species: E. merae

Binomial name
- Epilachna merae Gordon, 1975

Species of beetle

Epilachna merae is a species of beetle of the family Coccinellidae. It is found in Ecuador.

== Description ==
Adults reach a length of about 9.35 mm. Adults are black. The anterolateral angle and lateral margin of the pronotum are yellow and the elytron has a yellow lateral margin yellow, with a piceous border inside this yellow margin. The disk of the elytron is reddish brown.
