= Epilachna propinqua =

Scientific classification
- Kingdom: Animalia
- Phylum: Arthropoda
- Clade: Pancrustacea
- Class: Insecta
- Order: Coleoptera
- Suborder: Polyphaga
- Infraorder: Cucujiformia
- Family: Coccinellidae
- Genus: Epilachna
- Species: E. propinqua

Binomial name
- Epilachna propinqua (Weise, 1900)

Synonyms
- Solanophila propinqua Weise, 1900

Species of beetle

Epilachna propinqua is a species of beetle of the family Coccinellidae. It is found in Peru.

== Description ==
Adults reach a length of about 9.50–11.10 mm. The anterolateral angle of the pronotum is yellow and the elytron is reddish brown bordered with black and with three black vittae.
