= Epilachna pseudograpta =

Scientific classification
- Kingdom: Animalia
- Phylum: Arthropoda
- Clade: Pancrustacea
- Class: Insecta
- Order: Coleoptera
- Suborder: Polyphaga
- Infraorder: Cucujiformia
- Family: Coccinellidae
- Genus: Epilachna
- Species: E. pseudograpta

Binomial name
- Epilachna pseudograpta Gordon, 1975

Species of beetle

Epilachna pseudograpta is a species of beetle of the family Coccinellidae. It is found in Costa Rica.

== Description ==
Adults reach a length of about 7.35–8.41 mm. Adults are black. The elytron is reddish brown with a black border, two small reddish-brown spots near the lateral margin and a small reddish-brown spot on the apical angle.
