= Epilachna transverselineata =

Scientific classification
- Kingdom: Animalia
- Phylum: Arthropoda
- Clade: Pancrustacea
- Class: Insecta
- Order: Coleoptera
- Suborder: Polyphaga
- Infraorder: Cucujiformia
- Family: Coccinellidae
- Genus: Epilachna
- Species: E. transverselineata

Binomial name
- Epilachna transverselineata (Mader, 1958)

Synonyms
- Solanophila transverselineata Mader, 1958

Species of beetle

Epilachna transverselineata is a species of beetle of the family Coccinellidae. It is found in Bolivia and Ecuador.

== Description ==
Adults reach a length of about 9.46 – 12.19 mm. Adults are black. The elytron is also black, but with two yellow transverse bands.
