= Epilachna madida =

Scientific classification
- Kingdom: Animalia
- Phylum: Arthropoda
- Clade: Pancrustacea
- Class: Insecta
- Order: Coleoptera
- Suborder: Polyphaga
- Infraorder: Cucujiformia
- Family: Coccinellidae
- Genus: Epilachna
- Species: E. madida

Binomial name
- Epilachna madida Mulsant, 1850

Synonyms
- Epilachna nigrofasciata Mulsant, 1853

Species of beetle

Epilachna madida is a species of beetle of the family Coccinellidae. It is found in Venezuela and Colombia.

== Description ==
Adults reach a length of about 9.50–12.10 mm. Adults are black. The elytron is red with a black lateral margin, two black transverse bands and a black apical spot.
