= Epilachna callangae =

Scientific classification
- Kingdom: Animalia
- Phylum: Arthropoda
- Clade: Pancrustacea
- Class: Insecta
- Order: Coleoptera
- Suborder: Polyphaga
- Infraorder: Cucujiformia
- Family: Coccinellidae
- Genus: Epilachna
- Species: E. callangae

Binomial name
- Epilachna callangae Gordon, 1975

Synonyms
- Solanophila vittigera Weise, 1900

Species of beetle

Epilachna callangae is a species of beetle of the family Coccinellidae. It is found in Peru.

== Description ==
Adults reach a length of about 9.70 mm. The anterolateral angle of the pronotum is yellow and the elytron is yellowish orange with black basal and sutural margins and four black vittae.
