= Epilachna latimargo =

Scientific classification
- Kingdom: Animalia
- Phylum: Arthropoda
- Clade: Pancrustacea
- Class: Insecta
- Order: Coleoptera
- Suborder: Polyphaga
- Infraorder: Cucujiformia
- Family: Coccinellidae
- Genus: Epilachna
- Species: E. latimargo

Binomial name
- Epilachna latimargo (Weise, 1926)

Synonyms
- Solanophila latimargo Weise, 1926

Species of beetle

Epilachna latimargo is a species of beetle of the family Coccinellidae. It is found in Colombia.

== Description ==
Adults reach a length of about 7.43 mm. Adults are black. The anterolateral angle of the pronotum is pale and the elytron is yellow with a black border and a black band.
