= Epilachna minuta =

Scientific classification
- Kingdom: Animalia
- Phylum: Arthropoda
- Clade: Pancrustacea
- Class: Insecta
- Order: Coleoptera
- Suborder: Polyphaga
- Infraorder: Cucujiformia
- Family: Coccinellidae
- Genus: Epilachna
- Species: E. minuta

Binomial name
- Epilachna minuta Gordon, 1985

Synonyms
- Epilachna nana Gordon, 1975 (preocc.)

Species of beetle

Epilachna minuta is a species of beetle of the family Coccinellidae. It is found in Colombia.

== Description ==
Adults reach a length of about 5.43 mm. Adults are black. The anterolateral angle of the pronotum is yellow and the elytron is black with two large yellow spots.
