= Epilachna peltata =

Scientific classification
- Kingdom: Animalia
- Phylum: Arthropoda
- Clade: Pancrustacea
- Class: Insecta
- Order: Coleoptera
- Suborder: Polyphaga
- Infraorder: Cucujiformia
- Family: Coccinellidae
- Genus: Epilachna
- Species: E. peltata

Binomial name
- Epilachna peltata Erichson, 1847

Species of beetle

Epilachna peltata is a species of beetle of the family Coccinellidae. It is found in Bolivia and Peru.

== Description ==
Adults reach a length of about 7.86–8.80 mm. Adults are black. The anterolateral angle of the pronotum is yellow and the elytron has a large orange spot, forming a heart-shape in conjunction with the spot on the other elytron.
