= Epilachna walteri =

Scientific classification
- Kingdom: Animalia
- Phylum: Arthropoda
- Clade: Pancrustacea
- Class: Insecta
- Order: Coleoptera
- Suborder: Polyphaga
- Infraorder: Cucujiformia
- Family: Coccinellidae
- Genus: Epilachna
- Species: E. walteri

Binomial name
- Epilachna walteri (Sicard, 1913)

Synonyms
- Solanophila walteri Sicard, 1913

Species of beetle

Epilachna walteri is a species of beetle of the family Coccinellidae. It is found in Colombia.

== Description ==
Adults reach a length of about 6.75–8 mm. Adults are black. The anterolateral angle of the pronotum is yellow and the elytron is yellowish orange with three black spots.
