= Epilachna eusema =

Scientific classification
- Kingdom: Animalia
- Phylum: Arthropoda
- Clade: Pancrustacea
- Class: Insecta
- Order: Coleoptera
- Suborder: Polyphaga
- Infraorder: Cucujiformia
- Family: Coccinellidae
- Genus: Epilachna
- Species: E. eusema

Binomial name
- Epilachna eusema (Weise, 1904)

Synonyms
- Solanophila eusema Weise, 1904; Solanophila perdubia Weise, 1926

Species of beetle

Epilachna eusema is a species of beetle of the family Coccinellidae. It is found in Argentina.

== Description ==
Adults reach a length of about 5.65–7 mm. Adults are yellow. The elytron is bluish black with two yellow spots.
