= Epilachna championi =

Scientific classification
- Kingdom: Animalia
- Phylum: Arthropoda
- Clade: Pancrustacea
- Class: Insecta
- Order: Coleoptera
- Suborder: Polyphaga
- Infraorder: Cucujiformia
- Family: Coccinellidae
- Genus: Epilachna
- Species: E. championi

Binomial name
- Epilachna championi Gordon, 1975

Species of beetle

Epilachna championi is a species of beetle of the family Coccinellidae. It is found in Guatemala.

== Description ==
Adults reach a length of about 6.47–6.74 mm. Adults are brownish piceous with a reddish brown head. The pronotum has a reddish-brown margin and four reddish-brown spots. The elytron is reddish brown with a black border and seven black spots.
