= Epilachna gorhami =

Scientific classification
- Kingdom: Animalia
- Phylum: Arthropoda
- Clade: Pancrustacea
- Class: Insecta
- Order: Coleoptera
- Suborder: Polyphaga
- Infraorder: Cucujiformia
- Family: Coccinellidae
- Genus: Epilachna
- Species: E. gorhami

Binomial name
- Epilachna gorhami Gordon, 1975

Species of beetle

Epilachna gorhami is a species of beetle of the family Coccinellidae. It is found in Costa Rica and Guatemala.

== Description ==
Adults reach a length of about 5.68 mm. Adults are black with a reddish brown head. The pronotum is black with a piceous anterolateral angle and the elytron is reddish brown with five black spots and a black band.
