= Epilachna freudei =

Scientific classification
- Kingdom: Animalia
- Phylum: Arthropoda
- Clade: Pancrustacea
- Class: Insecta
- Order: Coleoptera
- Suborder: Polyphaga
- Infraorder: Cucujiformia
- Family: Coccinellidae
- Genus: Epilachna
- Species: E. freudei

Binomial name
- Epilachna freudei (Mader, 1958)

Synonyms
- Solanophila freudei Mader, 1958; Solanophila irritans Mader, 1958

Species of beetle

Epilachna freudei is a species of beetle of the family Coccinellidae. It is found in Bolivia.

== Description ==
Adults reach a length of about 5.30–7 mm. Adults are black. The elytron is black with two large yellow spots.
