= Epilachna tenebricosa =

Scientific classification
- Kingdom: Animalia
- Phylum: Arthropoda
- Clade: Pancrustacea
- Class: Insecta
- Order: Coleoptera
- Suborder: Polyphaga
- Infraorder: Cucujiformia
- Family: Coccinellidae
- Genus: Epilachna
- Species: E. tenebricosa

Binomial name
- Epilachna tenebricosa Mulsant, 1850

Species of beetle

Epilachna tenebricosa is a species of beetle of the family Coccinellidae. It is found in Mexico.

== Description ==
Adults reach a length of about 5.51–6 mm. Adults are black, while posterior one-third of the head and lateral and anterior angles of the pronotum are yellow. The elytron has scattered punctures.
