= Epilachna extrema =

Scientific classification
- Kingdom: Animalia
- Phylum: Arthropoda
- Clade: Pancrustacea
- Class: Insecta
- Order: Coleoptera
- Suborder: Polyphaga
- Infraorder: Cucujiformia
- Family: Coccinellidae
- Genus: Epilachna
- Species: E. extrema

Binomial name
- Epilachna extrema Crotch, 1874

Species of beetle

Epilachna extrema is a species of beetle of the family Coccinellidae. It is found in Ecuador and Colombia.

== Description ==
Adults reach a length of about 8.85–11 mm. Adults are black. The anterolateral angle and lateral margin of the pronotum are yellow and the elytron is black with a pale yellow lateral margin and a red spot.
