= Epilachna calligrapta =

Scientific classification
- Kingdom: Animalia
- Phylum: Arthropoda
- Clade: Pancrustacea
- Class: Insecta
- Order: Coleoptera
- Suborder: Polyphaga
- Infraorder: Cucujiformia
- Family: Coccinellidae
- Genus: Epilachna
- Species: E. calligrapta

Binomial name
- Epilachna calligrapta Gorham, 1899

Species of beetle

Epilachna calligrapta is a species of beetle of the family Coccinellidae. It is found in Panama.

== Description ==
Adults reach a length of about 7.31 mm. Adults are black. The anterolateral angle of the pronotum is piceous and the elytron is yellow with a paler yellow lateral margin and seven piceous spots.
