= Epilachna striola =

Scientific classification
- Kingdom: Animalia
- Phylum: Arthropoda
- Clade: Pancrustacea
- Class: Insecta
- Order: Coleoptera
- Suborder: Polyphaga
- Infraorder: Cucujiformia
- Family: Coccinellidae
- Genus: Epilachna
- Species: E. striola

Binomial name
- Epilachna striola (Weise, 1902)

Synonyms
- Solanophila striola Weise, 1902

Species of beetle

Epilachna striola is a species of beetle of the family Coccinellidae. It is found in Peru.

== Description ==
Adults reach a length of about 8.47–9.74 mm. Adults are black. The elytron is yellow with dark greenish blue margins and a dark greenish blue median vitta.
