= Epilachna amplipunctata =

Scientific classification
- Kingdom: Animalia
- Phylum: Arthropoda
- Clade: Pancrustacea
- Class: Insecta
- Order: Coleoptera
- Suborder: Polyphaga
- Infraorder: Cucujiformia
- Family: Coccinellidae
- Genus: Epilachna
- Species: E. amplipunctata

Binomial name
- Epilachna amplipunctata Gordon, 1975

Species of beetle

Epilachna amplipunctata is a species of beetle of the family Coccinellidae. It is found in Colombia.

== Description ==
Adults reach a length of about 7.63 mm. Adults are black. The elytron is yellow with black lateral and basal margins and a black vitta, as well as a brownish-yellow vitta.
