= Epilachna difficilis =

Scientific classification
- Kingdom: Animalia
- Phylum: Arthropoda
- Clade: Pancrustacea
- Class: Insecta
- Order: Coleoptera
- Suborder: Polyphaga
- Infraorder: Cucujiformia
- Family: Coccinellidae
- Genus: Epilachna
- Species: E. difficilis

Binomial name
- Epilachna difficilis Mulsant, 1850

Species of beetle

Epilachna difficilis is a species of beetle of the family Coccinellidae. It is found in Guatemala and Mexico.

== Description ==
Adults reach a length of about 5-6.15 mm. Adults are yellow, while the longitudinal median area of the pronotum is black and the elytron is yellow with nine piceous spots.
