= Epilachna ambigua =

Scientific classification
- Kingdom: Animalia
- Phylum: Arthropoda
- Clade: Pancrustacea
- Class: Insecta
- Order: Coleoptera
- Suborder: Polyphaga
- Infraorder: Cucujiformia
- Family: Coccinellidae
- Genus: Epilachna
- Species: E. ambigua

Binomial name
- Epilachna ambigua (Mader, 1958)

Synonyms
- Solanophila ambigua Mader, 1958

Species of beetle

Epilachna ambigua is a species of beetle of the family Coccinellidae. It is found in Bolivia.

== Description ==
Adults reach a length of about 6–7 mm. Adults are black. The elytron is yellow with a black border and a black vitta.
