= Epilachna buckleyi =

Scientific classification
- Kingdom: Animalia
- Phylum: Arthropoda
- Clade: Pancrustacea
- Class: Insecta
- Order: Coleoptera
- Suborder: Polyphaga
- Infraorder: Cucujiformia
- Family: Coccinellidae
- Genus: Epilachna
- Species: E. buckleyi

Binomial name
- Epilachna buckleyi Crotch, 1874

Species of beetle

Epilachna buckleyi is a species of beetle of the family Coccinellidae. It is found in Ecuador.

== Description ==
Adults reach a length of about 7.63–8.33 mm. Adults are black. The anterolateral angle of the pronotum is yellow and the elytron is black with a large yellow discal spot.
