= Epilachna corniventris =

Scientific classification
- Kingdom: Animalia
- Phylum: Arthropoda
- Clade: Pancrustacea
- Class: Insecta
- Order: Coleoptera
- Suborder: Polyphaga
- Infraorder: Cucujiformia
- Family: Coccinellidae
- Genus: Epilachna
- Species: E. corniventris

Binomial name
- Epilachna corniventris Gordon, 1975

Species of beetle

Epilachna corniventris is a species of beetle of the family Coccinellidae. It is found in Ecuador.

== Description ==
Adults reach a length of about 8.21 mm. Adults are black. The anterolateral angle of the pronotum is yellow and there is a small round yellow spot. The elytron is black with two yellow spots.
