= Epilachna bistriguttata =

Scientific classification
- Kingdom: Animalia
- Phylum: Arthropoda
- Clade: Pancrustacea
- Class: Insecta
- Order: Coleoptera
- Suborder: Polyphaga
- Infraorder: Cucujiformia
- Family: Coccinellidae
- Genus: Epilachna
- Species: E. bistriguttata

Binomial name
- Epilachna bistriguttata Mulsant, 1850

Species of beetle

Epilachna bistriguttata is a species of beetle of the family Coccinellidae. It is found in Bolivia.

== Description ==
Adults reach a length of about 5.48 mm. Adults are dark brown. The anterolateral margin of the pronotum is yellow and the elytron has three yellow spots.
