= Epilachna obscurella =

Scientific classification
- Kingdom: Animalia
- Phylum: Arthropoda
- Clade: Pancrustacea
- Class: Insecta
- Order: Coleoptera
- Suborder: Polyphaga
- Infraorder: Cucujiformia
- Family: Coccinellidae
- Genus: Epilachna
- Species: E. obscurella

Binomial name
- Epilachna obscurella Mulsant, 1850

Synonyms
- Epilachna murina Mulsant, 1850

Species of beetle

Epilachna obscurella is a species of beetle of the family Coccinellidae. It is found in Mexico.

== Description ==
Adults reach a length of about 6-7.22 mm. Adults are black. The elytron is also black, with seven piceous spots.
