= Epilachna albovittata =

Scientific classification
- Kingdom: Animalia
- Phylum: Arthropoda
- Clade: Pancrustacea
- Class: Insecta
- Order: Coleoptera
- Suborder: Polyphaga
- Infraorder: Cucujiformia
- Family: Coccinellidae
- Genus: Epilachna
- Species: E. albovittata

Binomial name
- Epilachna albovittata Weise, 1905

Synonyms
- Solanophila albovittata Weise, 1905

Species of beetle

Epilachna albovittata is a species of beetle of the family Coccinellidae. It is found in Argentina.

== Description ==
Adults reach a length of about 8-9.50 mm. Adults are black. The elytron is bluish black with two yellow vittae.
