= Epilachna pocohantae =

Scientific classification
- Kingdom: Animalia
- Phylum: Arthropoda
- Clade: Pancrustacea
- Class: Insecta
- Order: Coleoptera
- Suborder: Polyphaga
- Infraorder: Cucujiformia
- Family: Coccinellidae
- Genus: Epilachna
- Species: E. pocohantae

Binomial name
- Epilachna pocohantae Gordon, 1975

Species of beetle

Epilachna pocohantae is a species of beetle of the family Coccinellidae. It is found in Costa Rica, Guatemala, El Salvador and Mexico.

== Description ==
Adults reach a length of about 7-9.95 mm. Adults are brownish red. The elytron is also brownish red with no markings.
