= Epilachna weisei =

Scientific classification
- Kingdom: Animalia
- Phylum: Arthropoda
- Clade: Pancrustacea
- Class: Insecta
- Order: Coleoptera
- Suborder: Polyphaga
- Infraorder: Cucujiformia
- Family: Coccinellidae
- Genus: Epilachna
- Species: E. weisei

Binomial name
- Epilachna weisei (Sicard, 1912)

Synonyms
- Solanophila weisei Sicard, 1912

Species of beetle

Epilachna weisei is a species of beetle of the family Coccinellidae. It is found in Bolivia.

== Description ==
Adults reach a length of about 6.90–7.95 mm. Adults are black. The elytron has a posterior yellow spot.
