= Epilachna conifera =

Scientific classification
- Kingdom: Animalia
- Phylum: Arthropoda
- Clade: Pancrustacea
- Class: Insecta
- Order: Coleoptera
- Suborder: Polyphaga
- Infraorder: Cucujiformia
- Family: Coccinellidae
- Genus: Epilachna
- Species: E. conifera

Binomial name
- Epilachna conifera Gordon, 1975

Species of beetle

Epilachna conifera is a species of beetle of the family Coccinellidae. It is found in Argentina.

== Description ==
Adults reach a length of about 7-8.10 mm. Adults are black. The lateral margin of the pronotum is yellow and the elytron has a brownish-yellow median area bordered with piceous brown.
