= Epilachna darlingtoni =

Scientific classification
- Kingdom: Animalia
- Phylum: Arthropoda
- Clade: Pancrustacea
- Class: Insecta
- Order: Coleoptera
- Suborder: Polyphaga
- Infraorder: Cucujiformia
- Family: Coccinellidae
- Genus: Epilachna
- Species: E. darlingtoni

Binomial name
- Epilachna darlingtoni Gordon, 1975

Species of beetle

Epilachna darlingtoni is a species of beetle of the family Coccinellidae. It is found in Colombia.

== Description ==
Adults reach a length of about 8.10–10.5 mm. Adults are light reddish brown, while the lateral margin of the pronotum and elytron are yellow.
