= Epilachna napoensis =

Scientific classification
- Kingdom: Animalia
- Phylum: Arthropoda
- Clade: Pancrustacea
- Class: Insecta
- Order: Coleoptera
- Suborder: Polyphaga
- Infraorder: Cucujiformia
- Family: Coccinellidae
- Genus: Epilachna
- Species: E. napoensis

Binomial name
- Epilachna napoensis González, 2015

Species of beetle

Epilachna napoensis is a species of beetle of the family Coccinellidae. It is found in Ecuador.

== Description ==
Adults reach a length of about 9.5 mm. They have a black head and the pronotum is also black, but with oval yellow spots. The elytron is light brown, with a black suture, black base and black margin.
