= Epilachna velata =

Scientific classification
- Kingdom: Animalia
- Phylum: Arthropoda
- Clade: Pancrustacea
- Class: Insecta
- Order: Coleoptera
- Suborder: Polyphaga
- Infraorder: Cucujiformia
- Family: Coccinellidae
- Genus: Epilachna
- Species: E. velata

Binomial name
- Epilachna velata Erichson, 1847

Species of beetle

Epilachna velata is a species of beetle of the family Coccinellidae. It is found in Peru and Bolivia.

== Description ==
Adults reach a length of about 7.95–11.41 mm. Adults are black. The anterolateral angle of the pronotum is yellow and the elytron is dark brown with a faint black lateral border.
