= Epilachna jarugui =

Scientific classification
- Kingdom: Animalia
- Phylum: Arthropoda
- Clade: Pancrustacea
- Class: Insecta
- Order: Coleoptera
- Suborder: Polyphaga
- Infraorder: Cucujiformia
- Family: Coccinellidae
- Genus: Epilachna
- Species: E. jarugui

Binomial name
- Epilachna jarugui Gordon, 1975

Species of beetle

Epilachna jarugui is a species of beetle of the family Coccinellidae. It is found in Ecuador.

== Description ==
Adults reach a length of about 6.90 mm. Adults are black. The anterolateral angle of the pronotum is reddish yellow and the elytron is black with two large red spots.
