= Epilachna patula =

Scientific classification
- Kingdom: Animalia
- Phylum: Arthropoda
- Clade: Pancrustacea
- Class: Insecta
- Order: Coleoptera
- Suborder: Polyphaga
- Infraorder: Cucujiformia
- Family: Coccinellidae
- Genus: Epilachna
- Species: E. patula

Binomial name
- Epilachna patula Mulsant, 1850

Species of beetle

Epilachna patula is a species of beetle of the family Coccinellidae. It is found in Mexico.

== Description ==
Adults reach a length of about 6.10–7.10 mm. Adults are yellow. The pronotum has pronotum three black spots and the elytron is reddish yellow with four black spots and a median band.
