= Epilachna bisbivittata =

Scientific classification
- Kingdom: Animalia
- Phylum: Arthropoda
- Clade: Pancrustacea
- Class: Insecta
- Order: Coleoptera
- Suborder: Polyphaga
- Infraorder: Cucujiformia
- Family: Coccinellidae
- Genus: Epilachna
- Species: E. bisbivittata

Binomial name
- Epilachna bisbivittata Gordon, 1975

Species of beetle

Epilachna bisbivittata is a species of beetle of the family Coccinellidae. It is found in Peru.

== Description ==
Adults reach a length of about 8.58–10 mm. Adults are black. The elytron is yellow with bluish black margins and two bluish black vittae.
