= Epilachna boraustralis =

Scientific classification
- Kingdom: Animalia
- Phylum: Arthropoda
- Clade: Pancrustacea
- Class: Insecta
- Order: Coleoptera
- Suborder: Polyphaga
- Infraorder: Cucujiformia
- Family: Coccinellidae
- Genus: Epilachna
- Species: E. boraustralis

Binomial name
- Epilachna boraustralis Gordon, 1975

Species of beetle

Epilachna boraustralis is a species of beetle of the family Coccinellidae. It is found in Ecuador and Venezuela.

== Description ==
Adults reach a length of about 6.90–9.30 mm. Adults are brownish red. The elytron is brownish red with seven black spots.
