= Epilachna languida =

Scientific classification
- Kingdom: Animalia
- Phylum: Arthropoda
- Clade: Pancrustacea
- Class: Insecta
- Order: Coleoptera
- Suborder: Polyphaga
- Infraorder: Cucujiformia
- Family: Coccinellidae
- Genus: Epilachna
- Species: E. languida

Binomial name
- Epilachna languida (Weise, 1900)

Synonyms
- Solanophila languida Weise, 1900

Species of beetle

Epilachna languida is a species of beetle of the family Coccinellidae. It is found in Ecuador.

== Description ==
Adults reach a length of about 9 mm. Adults are black. The elytron is bluish black with two yellow spots.
