= Epilachna parvicollis =

Scientific classification
- Kingdom: Animalia
- Phylum: Arthropoda
- Clade: Pancrustacea
- Class: Insecta
- Order: Coleoptera
- Suborder: Polyphaga
- Infraorder: Cucujiformia
- Family: Coccinellidae
- Genus: Epilachna
- Species: E. parvicollis

Binomial name
- Epilachna parvicollis Casey, 1899

Species of beetle

Epilachna parvicollis is a species of beetle of the family Coccinellidae. It is found in Bolivia.

== Description ==
Adults reach a length of about 9.60–10 mm. Adults are black. The elytron is light reddish brown with two faint piceous spots.
