= Epilachna vulnerata =

Scientific classification
- Kingdom: Animalia
- Phylum: Arthropoda
- Clade: Pancrustacea
- Class: Insecta
- Order: Coleoptera
- Suborder: Polyphaga
- Infraorder: Cucujiformia
- Family: Coccinellidae
- Genus: Epilachna
- Species: E. vulnerata

Binomial name
- Epilachna vulnerata Gorham, 1899

Species of beetle

Epilachna vulnerata is a species of beetle of the family Coccinellidae. It is found in Mexico.

== Description ==
Adults reach a length of about 7.48–7.78 mm. Adults are black. The elytron is dark red with red borders and two black bands.
