= Epilachna bistrispilota =

Scientific classification
- Kingdom: Animalia
- Phylum: Arthropoda
- Clade: Pancrustacea
- Class: Insecta
- Order: Coleoptera
- Suborder: Polyphaga
- Infraorder: Cucujiformia
- Family: Coccinellidae
- Genus: Epilachna
- Species: E. bistrispilota

Binomial name
- Epilachna bistrispilota Gordon, 1975

Species of beetle

Epilachna bistrispilota is a species of beetle of the family Coccinellidae. It is found in Bolivia.

== Description ==
Adults reach a length of about 8.61–9 mm. Adults are black. The elytron is black with three yellow spots.
