= Epilachna octoverrucata =

Scientific classification
- Kingdom: Animalia
- Phylum: Arthropoda
- Clade: Pancrustacea
- Class: Insecta
- Order: Coleoptera
- Suborder: Polyphaga
- Infraorder: Cucujiformia
- Family: Coccinellidae
- Genus: Epilachna
- Species: E. octoverrucata

Binomial name
- Epilachna octoverrucata Mulsant, 1850

Species of beetle

Epilachna octoverrucata is a species of beetle of the family Coccinellidae. It is found in Colombia.

== Description ==
Adults reach a length of about 8.10 mm. Adults are black. The elytron has four yellow spots.
