= Epilachna olmosi =

Scientific classification
- Kingdom: Animalia
- Phylum: Arthropoda
- Clade: Pancrustacea
- Class: Insecta
- Order: Coleoptera
- Suborder: Polyphaga
- Infraorder: Cucujiformia
- Family: Coccinellidae
- Genus: Epilachna
- Species: E. olmosi

Binomial name
- Epilachna olmosi Gordon, 1975

Species of beetle

Epilachna olmosi is a species of beetle of the family Coccinellidae. It is found in Peru.

== Description ==
Adults reach a length of about 6.05–6.35 mm. Adults are dark brown. The elytron is black with four yellow spots.
