= Epilachna godmani =

Scientific classification
- Kingdom: Animalia
- Phylum: Arthropoda
- Clade: Pancrustacea
- Class: Insecta
- Order: Coleoptera
- Suborder: Polyphaga
- Infraorder: Cucujiformia
- Family: Coccinellidae
- Genus: Epilachna
- Species: E. godmani

Binomial name
- Epilachna godmani Gordon, 1975

Species of beetle

Epilachna godmani is a species of beetle of the family Coccinellidae. It is found in Guatemala.

== Description ==
Adults reach a length of about 6-6.81 mm. Adults are reddish brown. The elytron is brown with seven piceous spots.
