= Epilachna peruviana =

Scientific classification
- Kingdom: Animalia
- Phylum: Arthropoda
- Clade: Pancrustacea
- Class: Insecta
- Order: Coleoptera
- Suborder: Polyphaga
- Infraorder: Cucujiformia
- Family: Coccinellidae
- Genus: Epilachna
- Species: E. peruviana

Binomial name
- Epilachna peruviana Crotch, 1874

Species of beetle

Epilachna peruviana is a species of beetle of the family Coccinellidae. It is found in Peru.

== Description ==
Adults reach a length of about 8.78 mm, are black, and their elytron is a dull, bluish-black with two yellow spots.
