= Epilachna tritea =

Scientific classification
- Kingdom: Animalia
- Phylum: Arthropoda
- Clade: Pancrustacea
- Class: Insecta
- Order: Coleoptera
- Suborder: Polyphaga
- Infraorder: Cucujiformia
- Family: Coccinellidae
- Genus: Epilachna
- Species: E. tritea

Binomial name
- Epilachna tritea Gordon, 1975

Species of beetle

Epilachna tritea is a species of beetle of the family Coccinellidae. It is found in Venezuela.

== Description ==
Adults reach a length of about 9.15–10.83 mm. Adults are black. The elytron is also black, but with two yellow bands.
