= Epilachna tumida =

Scientific classification
- Kingdom: Animalia
- Phylum: Arthropoda
- Clade: Pancrustacea
- Class: Insecta
- Order: Coleoptera
- Suborder: Polyphaga
- Infraorder: Cucujiformia
- Family: Coccinellidae
- Genus: Epilachna
- Species: E. tumida

Binomial name
- Epilachna tumida Crotch, 1899

Species of beetle

Epilachna tumida is a species of beetle of the family Coccinellidae. It is found in Costa Rica and Panama.

== Description ==
Adults reach a length of about 10-11.30 mm. Adults are black. The elytron is black with a red discal spot.
