= Epilachna fryii =

Scientific classification
- Kingdom: Animalia
- Phylum: Arthropoda
- Clade: Pancrustacea
- Class: Insecta
- Order: Coleoptera
- Suborder: Polyphaga
- Infraorder: Cucujiformia
- Family: Coccinellidae
- Genus: Epilachna
- Species: E. fryii

Binomial name
- Epilachna fryii Crotch, 1874

Species of beetle

Epilachna fryii is a species of beetle of the family Coccinellidae. It is found in Ecuador.

== Description ==
Adults reach a length of about 10.43–13.50 mm. Adults are black. The elytron is bluish black with three orange bands.
