= Epilachna hektea =

Scientific classification
- Kingdom: Animalia
- Phylum: Arthropoda
- Clade: Pancrustacea
- Class: Insecta
- Order: Coleoptera
- Suborder: Polyphaga
- Infraorder: Cucujiformia
- Family: Coccinellidae
- Genus: Epilachna
- Species: E. hektea

Binomial name
- Epilachna hektea Gordon, 1975

Species of beetle

Epilachna hektea is a species of beetle of the family Coccinellidae. It is found in Ecuador.

== Description ==
Adults reach a length of about 8.15–8.18 mm. Adults are black. The elytron is black with two transverse orange bands.
