= Epilachna obliqua =

Scientific classification
- Kingdom: Animalia
- Phylum: Arthropoda
- Clade: Pancrustacea
- Class: Insecta
- Order: Coleoptera
- Suborder: Polyphaga
- Infraorder: Cucujiformia
- Family: Coccinellidae
- Genus: Epilachna
- Species: E. obliqua

Binomial name
- Epilachna obliqua Gordon, 1975

Species of beetle

Epilachna obliqua is a species of beetle of the family Coccinellidae. It is found in Peru.

== Description ==
Adults reach a length of about 6.80 mm. Adults are black. The elytron is greenish black with four yellow spots.
