= Epilachna eximia =

Scientific classification
- Kingdom: Animalia
- Phylum: Arthropoda
- Clade: Pancrustacea
- Class: Insecta
- Order: Coleoptera
- Suborder: Polyphaga
- Infraorder: Cucujiformia
- Family: Coccinellidae
- Genus: Epilachna
- Species: E. eximia

Binomial name
- Epilachna eximia Gordon, 1975

Species of beetle

Epilachna eximia is a species of beetle of the family Coccinellidae. It is found in Colombia.

== Description ==
Adults reach a length of about 6–7 mm. Adults are black. The elytron is black with a large orange spot.
