= Epilachna bourcieri =

Scientific classification
- Kingdom: Animalia
- Phylum: Arthropoda
- Clade: Pancrustacea
- Class: Insecta
- Order: Coleoptera
- Suborder: Polyphaga
- Infraorder: Cucujiformia
- Family: Coccinellidae
- Genus: Epilachna
- Species: E. bourcieri

Binomial name
- Epilachna bourcieri Mulsant, 1850

Species of beetle

Epilachna bourcieri is a species of beetle of the family Coccinellidae. It is found in Bolivia.

== Description ==
Adults reach a length of about 6.15–6.65 mm and are black.
