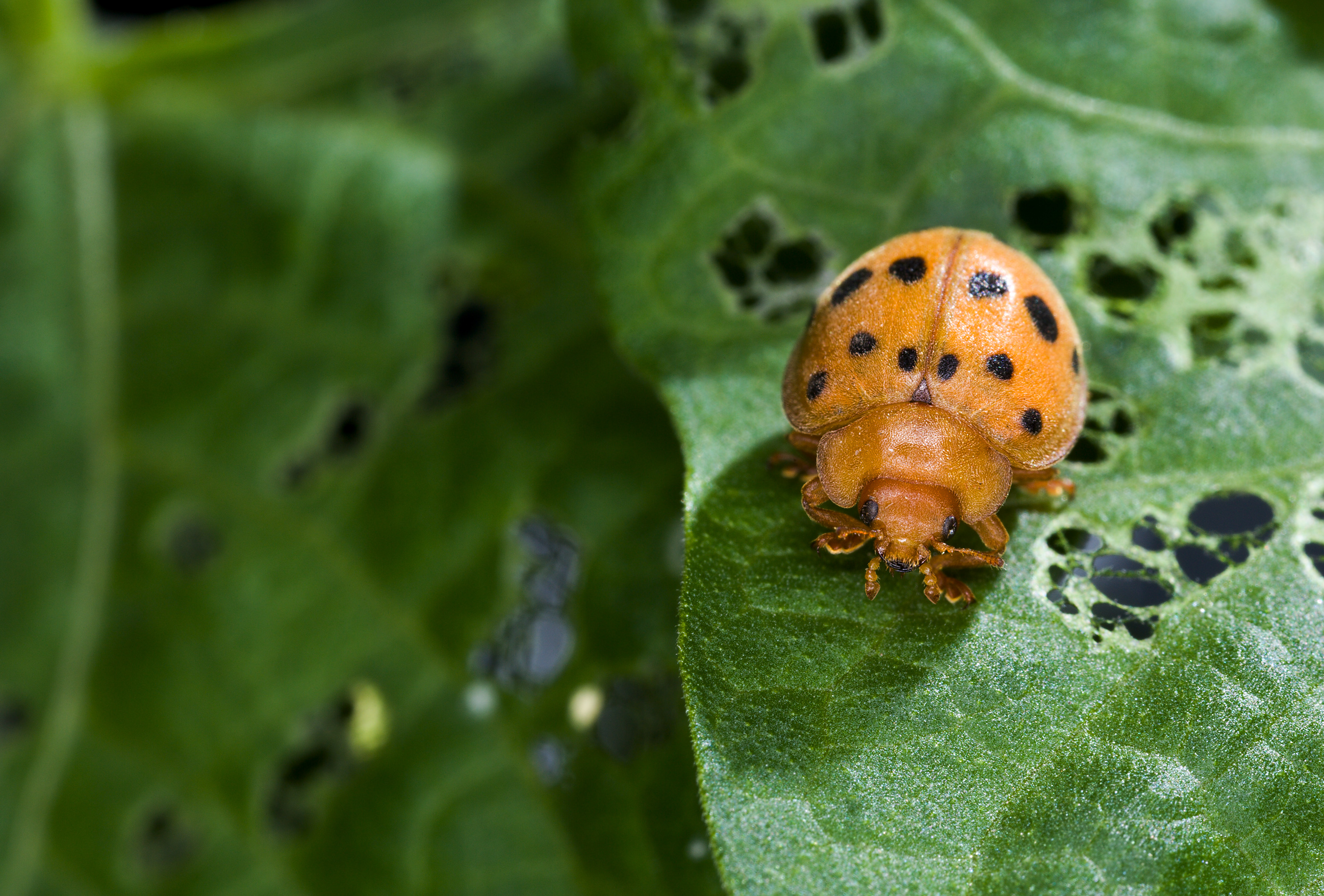
- Epilachna varivestis, the Mexican bean beetle

Scientific classification
- Kingdom: Animalia
- Phylum: Arthropoda
- Clade: Pancrustacea
- Class: Insecta
- Order: Coleoptera
- Suborder: Polyphaga
- Infraorder: Cucujiformia
- Family: Coccinellidae
- Subfamily: Epilachninae; Mulsant, 1846

Tribes
- Cynegetini; Epilachnini; Epivertini; Eremochilini

= Epilachninae =

Subfamily of beetles

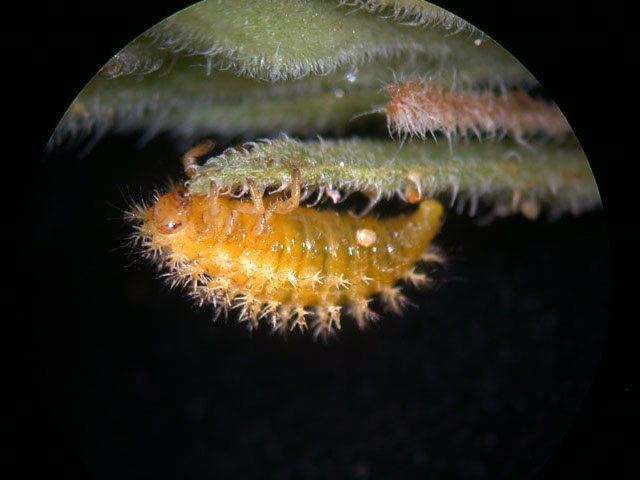
Henosepilachna argus larva, lateral aspect

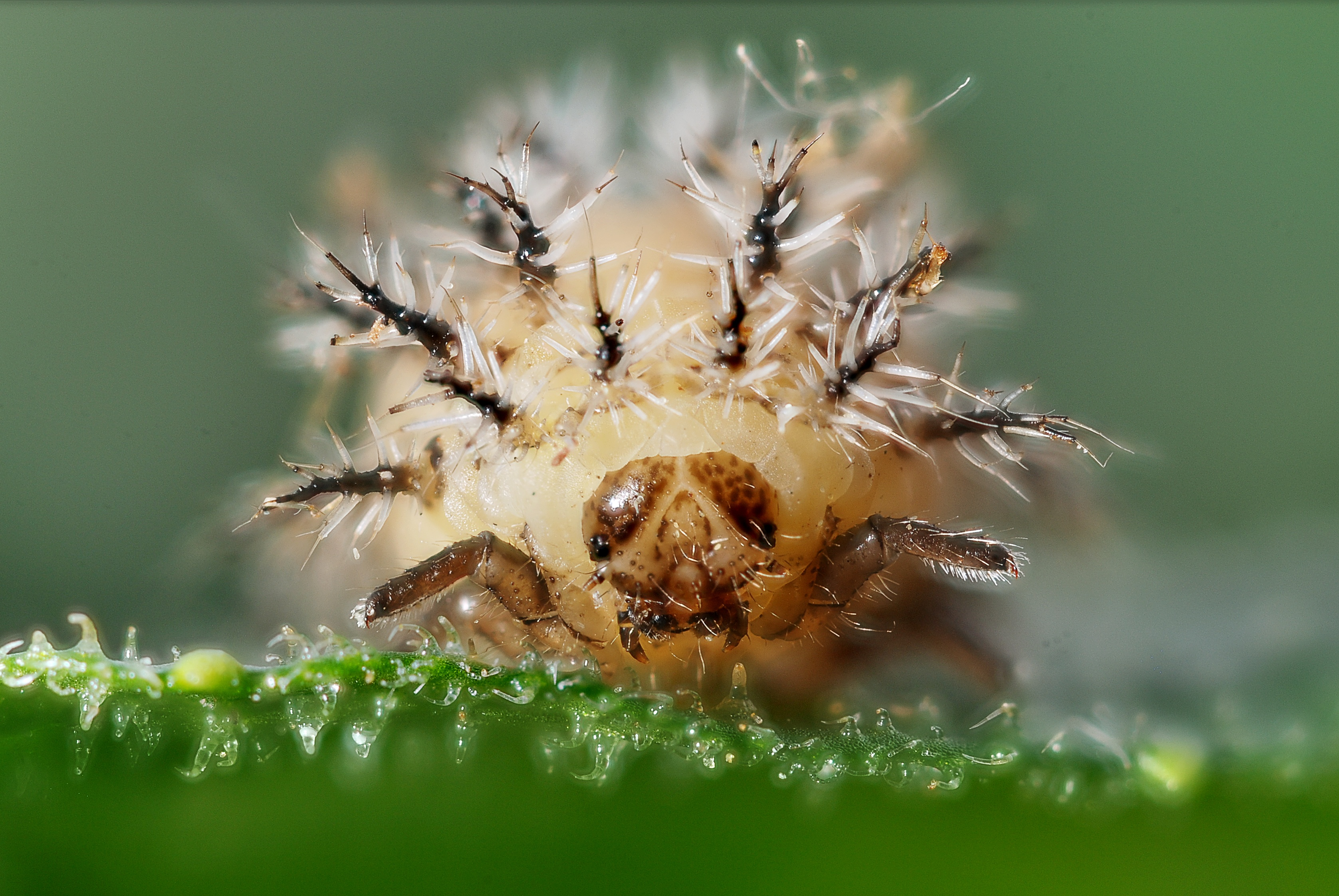
Henosepilachna argus larva, frontal aspect. Head capsule width = 1.2 mm

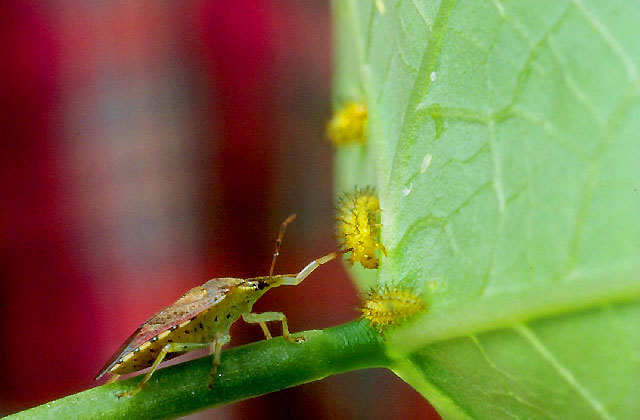
Spined soldier bug, Podisus maculiventris preying on larvae of Epilachna varivestis

The Epilachninae are a subfamily of the family of lady beetles, the Coccinellidae, in the order Coleoptera. Superficially, they look much like other ladybirds in the larger subfamily Coccinellinae, but they differ importantly in their biology, in that the members of the subfamily are largely or completely leaf-feeding herbivores rather than being predators. Accordingly, several members of the subfamily are crop pests, and sometimes cause locally serious crop losses.

== Taxonomy ==
The Epilachninae constitute about 16% of the described species of the Coccinellidae. Their identification is no problem in the field when examining routine crop damage, because they are selective feeders, but a specimen obtained out of context can be troublesome; their markings are not consistent, so offhand identification is unreliable. For reliable identification, one may have recourse to dissection to inspect the genitalia, or may inspect the eggs and larvae, which often are more distinctive than the adults.

The taxonomy of the Epilachninae is constantly in flux, and while little disagreement exists about their status as members of the Coccinellidae, various authors disagree widely in their classifications; some recent authors treat them as a tribe (or series of tribes) within the subfamily Coccinellinae (e.g.), but the most recent phylogenies provide evidence that the group is a monophyletic subfamily. There is likewise disagreement as to the number of tribes within Epilachninae, though 4 tribes is the most commonly-recognized system (e.g.). Over a dozen new genera have been recently described or elevated from subgeneric rank in the tribe Epilachnini alone, most of which were formerly included in Epilachna. Questions have been raised as to whether the single known species of Subcoccinella belongs in the Epilachninae at all; it has been included in the tribe Epilachnini on the grounds of morphology, in particular the herbivorous mouthparts, but the resemblance may have arisen by adaptation to plant feeding.

== Biology ==
The Epilachninae are most notorious as pests of crops in the families Solanaceae and Cucurbitaceae, but as a group they feed on a much wider range of plants. However, most species in the subfamily are monophagous, each feeding on just one species of plant, or at most a narrow range of closely related species. Among the crop plants they attack are grains such as maize, and legumes such as beans, including soya. Others attack spinach, and yet others feed on Brassicaceae and cotton.

Conversely, some interest is ongoing in certain species of Henosepilachna as natural controls of pest thistles, and in fact most Epilachninae attack plants of little agricultural interest.

Generally, members of the Epilachninae attack plants by scraping one face of a leaf, largely leaving the larger veins and the epidermis on the far face more or less intact. As a rule, the beetles (i.e. the adults) will feed on the upper surface of the leaf, whereas the larvae feed on the lower surface. Any given species leaves characteristic marks on the leaf as it eats; for example, those that feed on maize tend to feed in long streaks parallel with the veins of the plant. Those feeding on Solanaceae leaves are more inclined to leave little arcs of skeletonised leaf.

The eggs look like typical coccinellid eggs, yellow, two or three times longer than wide, stuck onto the leaf surface, standing erect in batches of a few dozen each. A single female is likely to lay a few hundred eggs, all factors being favourable. Microscopically, the eggs differ from most other coccinellid eggs in that they have a more definite reticular pattern of sculpting on the chorion; in most Coccinellidae, the chorion is externally smooth. The larvae differ in appearance from those of other Coccinellidae in that they are covered with bands of spiny projections. A larva generally passes through five instars in a period of four to five weeks, after which it will anchor itself to a suitable surface, usually in a protected spot on the plant, where it changes its skin once more, forming a typical coccinellid pupa, from which it emerges as a beetle imago after several days.

Many species have just one or perhaps two generations in a year. Commonly, such species have the remarkable habit, which also occurs in some other coccinellid subfamilies, of migrating tens of kilometres to the highest point on a nearby ridge or peak, hibernating or aestivating in masses.

== Control ==
Like many other beetles, the Epilachninae are hosts to parasitoid wasps that variously attack the eggs or larvae. Some predatory Pentatomidae also attack the larvae. Where the crop plants are vigorous and the natural enemies are present, it is not often advisable to apply insecticides, partly because infestations tend to respond poorly, and partly because the pesticides also kill the predators. Some of the currently recognised pest species quite likely have become pests just because of incompetent integrated pest management. Also, when dealing with the univoltine or bivoltine species, the infestation is brief, just a few weeks, before the beetle population moves off to aestivate. However, in a region where the biology is well understood, it may be worth spraying the inactive masses of beetles, always bearing in mind that if biologically naive practitioners spray the wrong species of aestivating beetles, the results could be expensive.

== Genera ==
Tribe Epilachnini

- Adira
- Afidenta
- Afidentula
- Afissa
- Afilachna
- Chazeauiana
- Chnootriba
- Diekeana
- Epilachna
- Henosepilachna
- Macrolasia
- Papuaepilachna
- Solanophila
- Subafissa
- Subcoccinella
- Toxotoma
- Uniparodentata

Tribe Epivertini

- Epiverta

Tribe Eremochilini

- Eremochilus

Tribe Cynegetini

- Cynegetis
- Damatula
- Figura
- Lorma
- Mada
- Malata
- Megatela
- Merma
- Pseudodira
- Tropha
