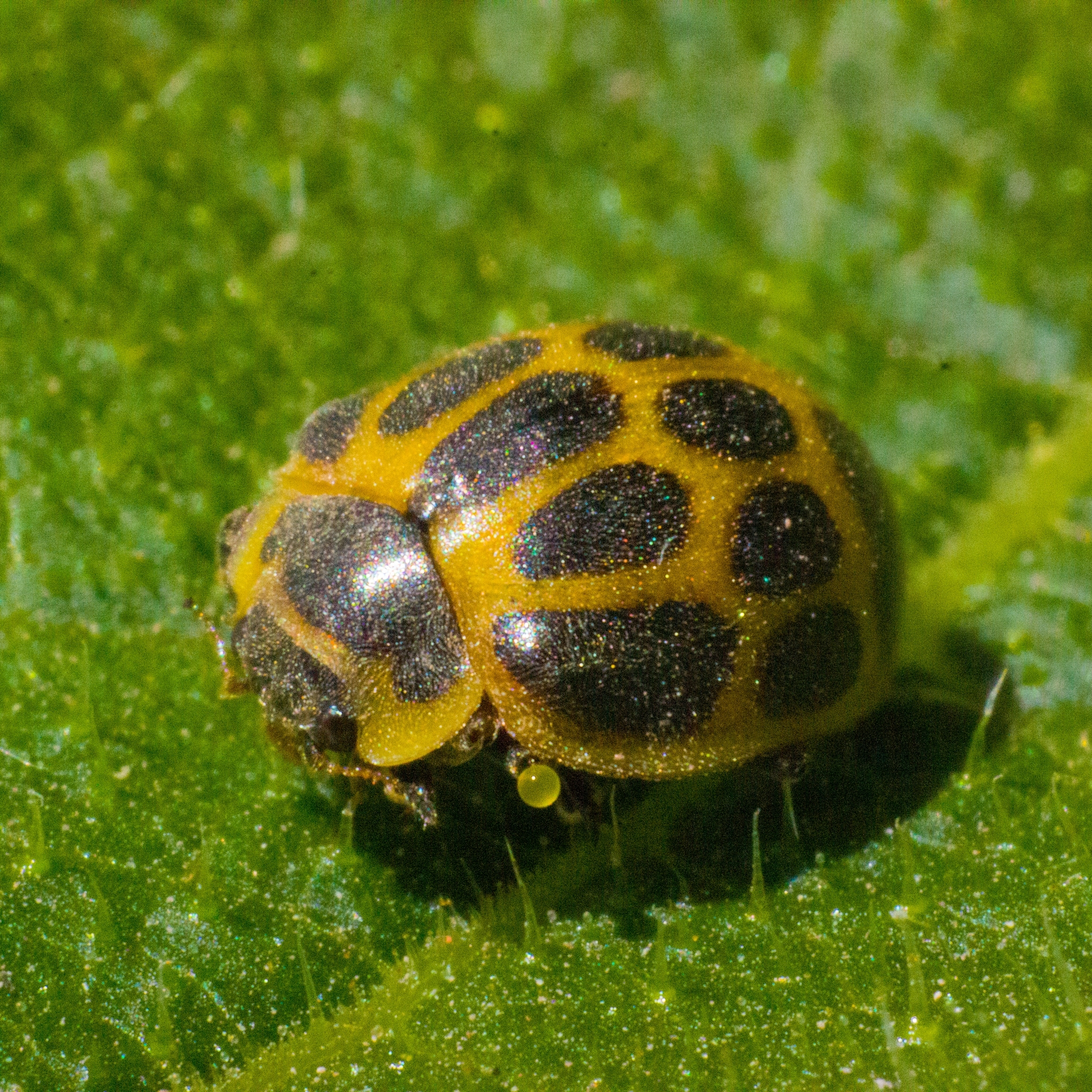
- Epilachna paenulata

Scientific classification
- Kingdom: Animalia
- Phylum: Arthropoda
- Clade: Pancrustacea
- Class: Insecta
- Order: Coleoptera
- Suborder: Polyphaga
- Infraorder: Cucujiformia
- Family: Coccinellidae
- Subfamily: Coccinellinae
- Tribe: Epilachnini; Mulsant, 1846

Synonyms
- Cynegetini Thomson, 1866; Madaini Gordon, 1975; Epivertini Pang and Mao, 1979; Eremochilini Gordon & Vanderberg, 1987

= Epilachnini =

Tribe of beetles

The Epilachnini are a tribe of insects within the family Coccinellidae.

== Genera ==
- Adira
- Afidenta
- Afidentula
- Afissa
- Chazeauiana
- Chnootriba
- Cynegetis
- Damatula
- Diekeana
- Epilachna
- Epiverta
- Eremochilus
- Figura
- Henosepilachna
- Lorma
- Macrolasia
- Mada
- Malata
- Megatela
- Merma
- Papuaepilachna
- Pseudodira
- Solanophila
- Subcoccinella
- Toxotoma
- Tropha
- Uniparodentata
