= Epilachna decemmaculata =

Scientific classification
- Kingdom: Animalia
- Phylum: Arthropoda
- Clade: Pancrustacea
- Class: Insecta
- Order: Coleoptera
- Suborder: Polyphaga
- Infraorder: Cucujiformia
- Family: Coccinellidae
- Subfamily: Coccinellinae
- Tribe: Epilachnini
- Genus: Epilachna
- Species: E. decemmaculata

Binomial name
- Epilachna decemmaculata Redtenbacher, 1844

Species of beetle

Epilachna decemmaculata, is a species of lady beetle found in India, Bhutan, China (Tibet), Taiwan, Sri Lanka and Myanmar.
