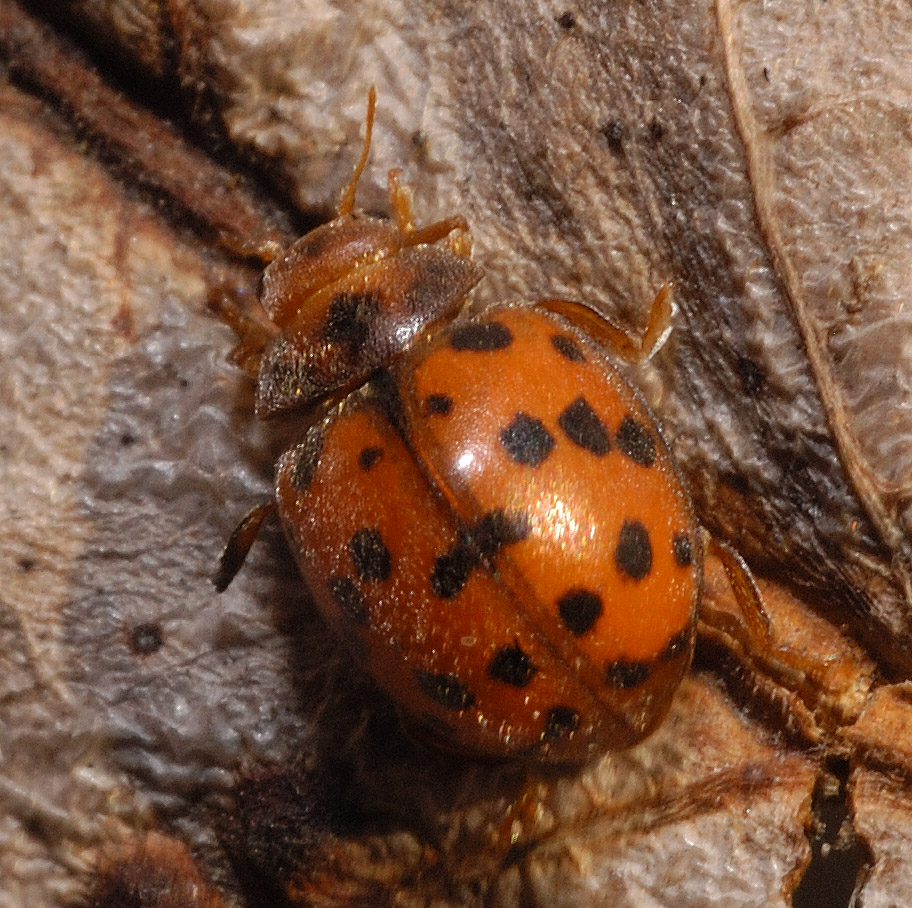
- 24-spot ladybird
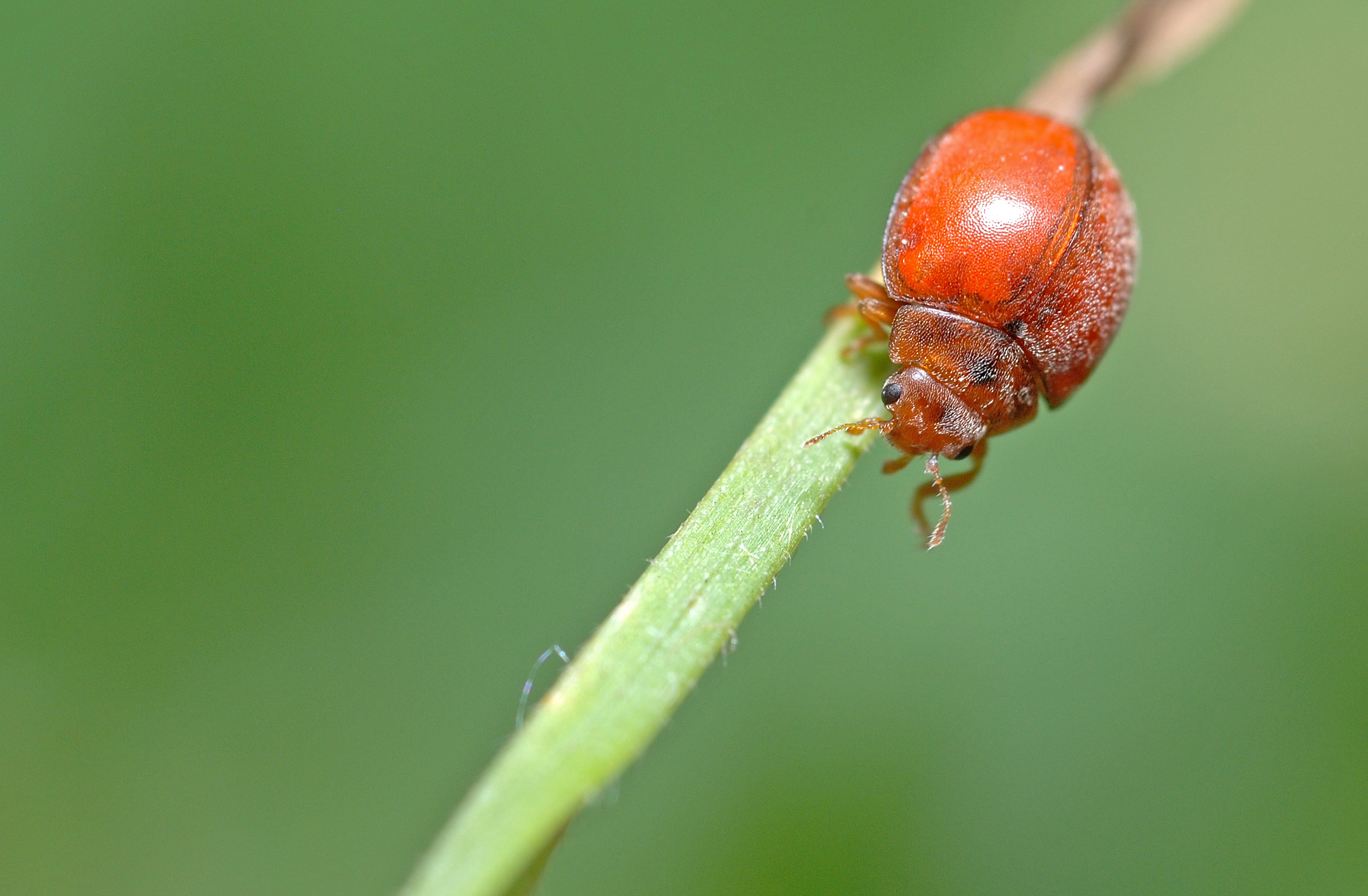
- Adult - form without spots

Scientific classification
- Kingdom: Animalia
- Phylum: Arthropoda
- Clade: Pancrustacea
- Class: Insecta
- Order: Coleoptera
- Suborder: Polyphaga
- Infraorder: Cucujiformia
- Family: Coccinellidae
- Subfamily: Coccinellinae
- Tribe: Epilachnini
- Genus: Subcoccinella; Guérin-Méneville, 1844
- Species: S. vigintiquatuorpunctata

Binomial name
- Subcoccinella vigintiquatuorpunctata (Linnaeus, 1758)

Synonyms
- Coccinella vigintiquatuorpunctata Coccinella vigintiquinquepunctata Subcoccinella 24-punctata Subcoccinella vigintiquattuorpunctata Subcoccinella coreae Park & Yoon, 1991 (disputed)

= Subcoccinella vigintiquatuorpunctata =

24-spot ladybird

Species of beetle

Subcoccinella vigintiquatuorpunctata (the 24-spot ladybird) is a beetle in the family Coccinellidae. It is the only member of the genus Subcoccinella (though this is disputed; see below). It has the typical, almost semi-spherical, ladybird shape and is patterned with spots. However it differs from many of the well-known ladybirds in being neither smooth and shiny nor an eater of aphids: the wing-cases look velvety and it eats the leaves of herbaceous plants.

== Names ==
The common names for this insect in many languages follow the binomial name and mention that it has twenty-four spots, but in English there is great variation in how this is written, with little consensus over the use of words or numerals, capitalisation, placement of hyphens and whether to use "spot", "spotted", "point" or "pointed"; "ladybird", "ladybird beetle" or "ladybug". There is even disagreement about the spelling of the Latin "vigintiquatuorpunctata" with some authoritative UK lists preferring a double "t": "vigintiquattuopunctata". For ease it is often written "Subcoccinella 24-punctata". Given the multitude of name formations, it is probably best to use just the genus "Subcoccinella" when carrying out a web search for information about this insect to avoid missing texts that use variant spellings - it's the only species in the genus. In the US it is also known as the "Alfalfa Lady Beetle", though rarely found on alfalfa in North America.

== Description ==
The adult 24-spot is a small ladybird, usually 3 to 4 mm long. It has the quintessential ladybird shape, quite domed with the sides forming a smooth curve from head to pronotum to wing-cases. The wing-cases are covered with short pale hairs, and though these are hard to see without a hand lens, they give the ladybird a distinctive matt appearance. The ladybird is dark orange, including legs and antennae. There are black spots on the wing cases. These vary in number and size but there are often about 20 to 24 and usually no more than 26. Sometimes spots are joined together or they can be absent completely. Dark (melanic) forms are very rare. Another extremely rare form has yellow spots.

Larvae are 4 to 6mm long and pale grey-green with darker speckles. They are covered with branched spines. These spines are also present in the pupa, enabling the pupa to secrete noxious alkaloids as a defence against predators.

There are five European species in the subfamily Epilachninae, all herbivorous and somewhat hairy. The 24-spot Ladybird can be distinguished from the similarly patterned Bryony Ladybird - Henosepilachna argus (6 to 8 mm) by its small size (3 to 4 mm). Cynegetis impunctata, another small ladybird, is browner and has no spots. It also has a black head and this separates it from the form of the 24-spot Ladybird without spots.

This ladybird usually has no wings under the elytra (wing cases) and these individuals are unable to fly. A study found no winged specimens in a UK sample whereas 40% of those from Hungary and Romania had wings. However, as even the winged specimens carried the gene that causes atrophy, it is thought that winglessness is a trend that will increase.

== Distribution ==
This ladybird is an Old World species occurring across Europe, North Africa, European Russia, the Caucasus, Siberia, the Russian Far East, Belarus, Ukraine, Moldova, Transcaucasia, Kazakhstan, Middle Asia, Western Asia, Afghanistan, Mongolia, China, North and South Korea. It was introduced into North America some time last century with the first records from Pennsylvania in 1972. In Britain it is more common in the south.

== Taxonomy ==
This species is very broadly distributed and somewhat variable over its range; in 1991, a pair of researchers proposed that specimens from South Korea represented a distinct and previously unrecognized species, which they named Subcoccinella coreae. Subsequent researchers disputed this, indicating that in their opinion there was no clear evidence that this was anything beyond a population-level difference, in need of better supporting evidence to support the validity of the proposed species.

== Habitat ==
S. vigintiquatuorpunctata is found in many different habitats (Pontic–Caspian steppe, Pannonian Steppe and unimproved grassland, quarries, wasteland, ruderal areas, Western European broadleaf forests mixed forests and near rivers and in other life zones of central Europe).

== Biology ==
Adults can be found from late Spring until the Autumn. They appear commonly on flowers, especially Apiaceae. Eggs are laid in May and larvae develop in about six weeks. New generation adults usually are active until October or November.

Larvae feed only on the mycelium of Erysiphales (mainly Podosphaera on trees (in particular Quercus robur and Fraxinus excelsior) Also on these fungi on Poaceae, Astragalus and some species of the families Fabaceae and Boraginaceae) The insects carry spores of the fungi.

== Life cycle ==
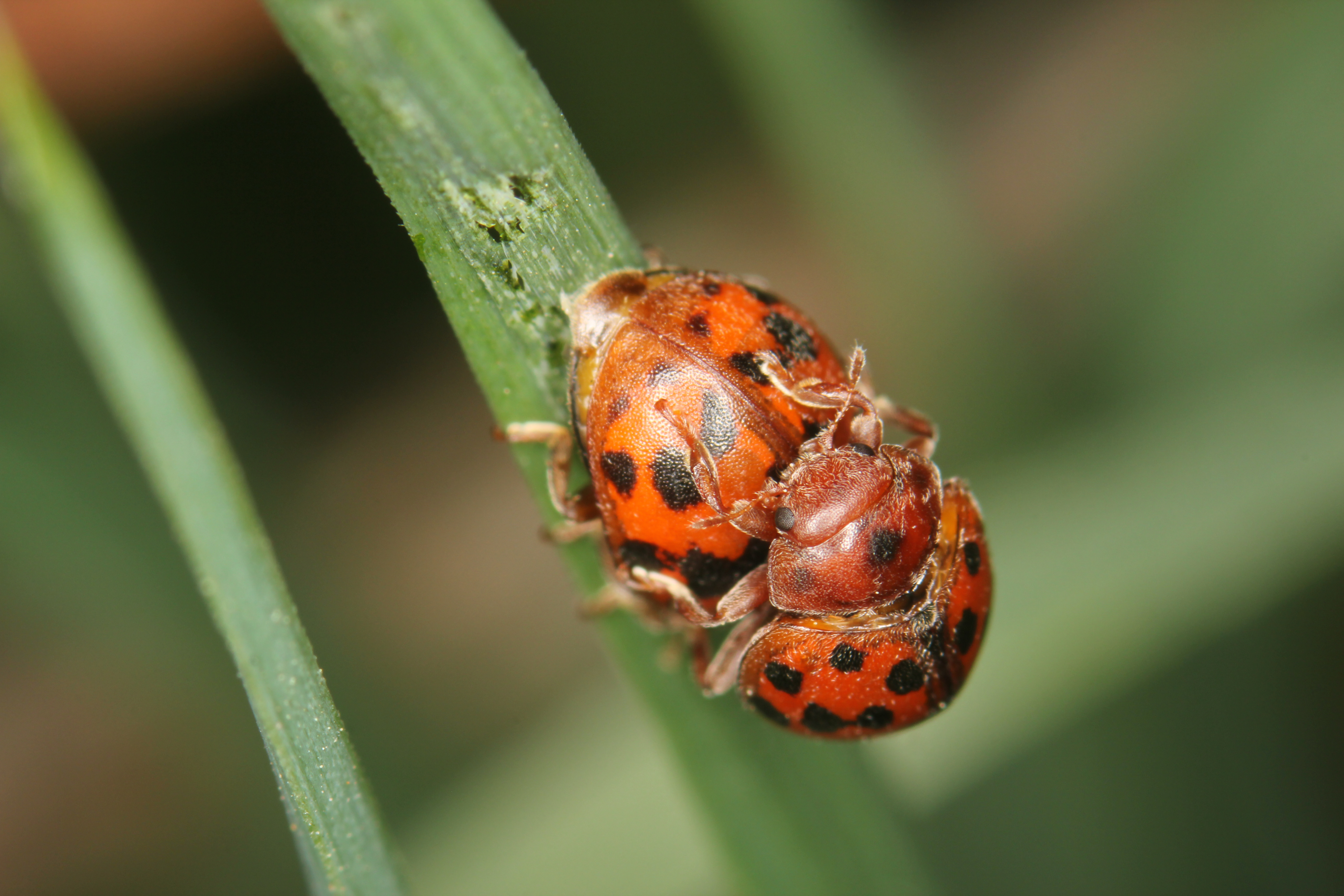
Mating

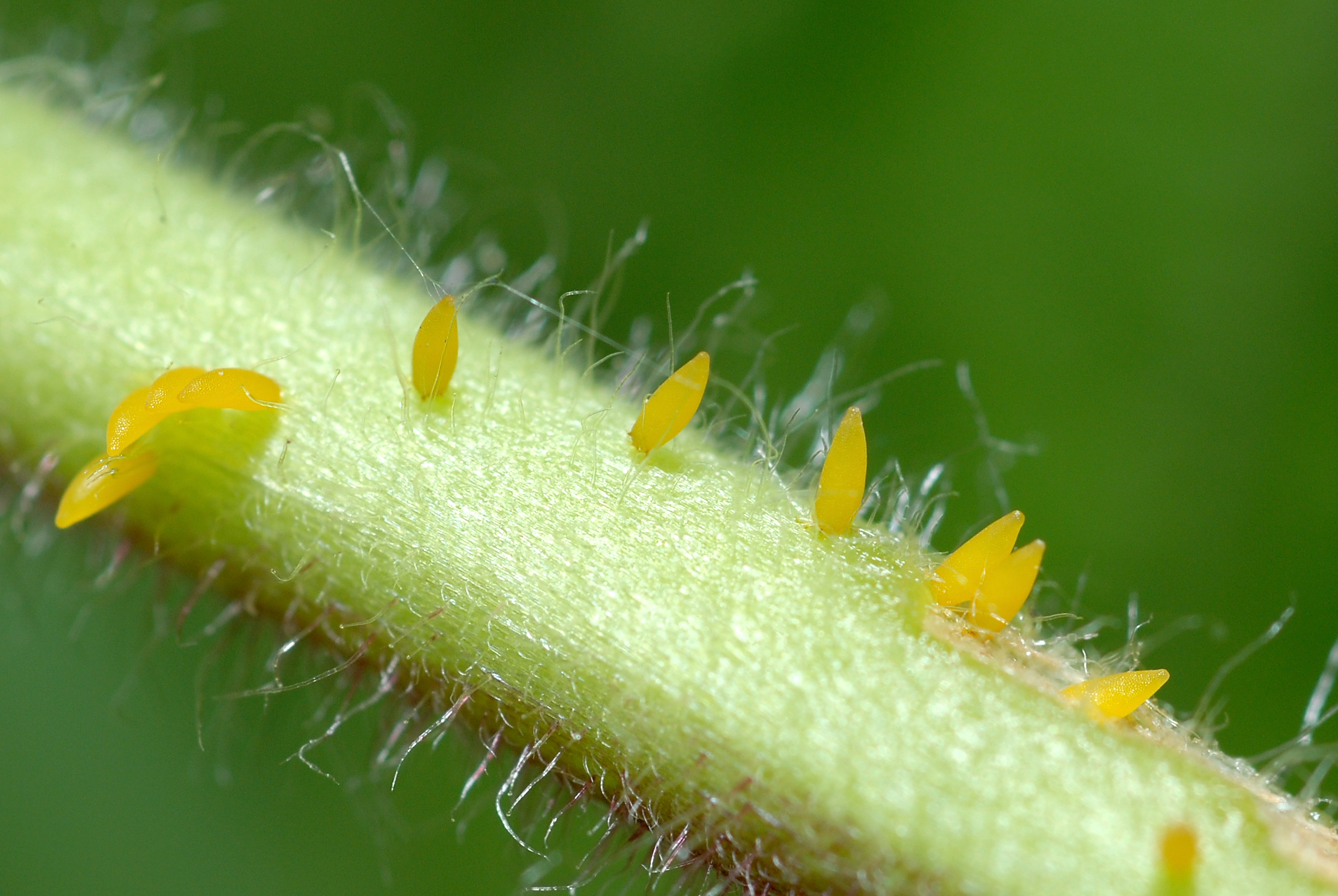
Eggs

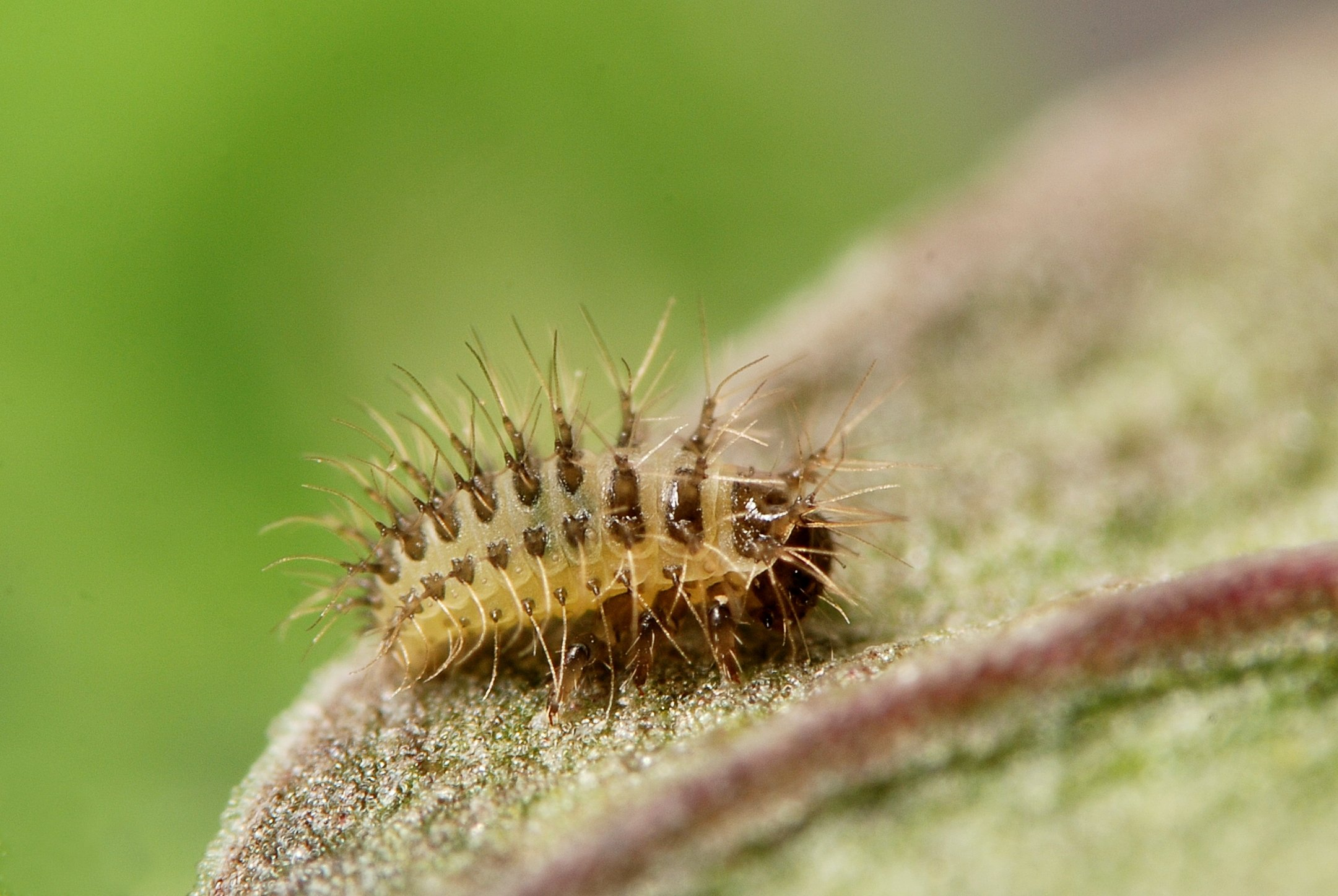
Larva

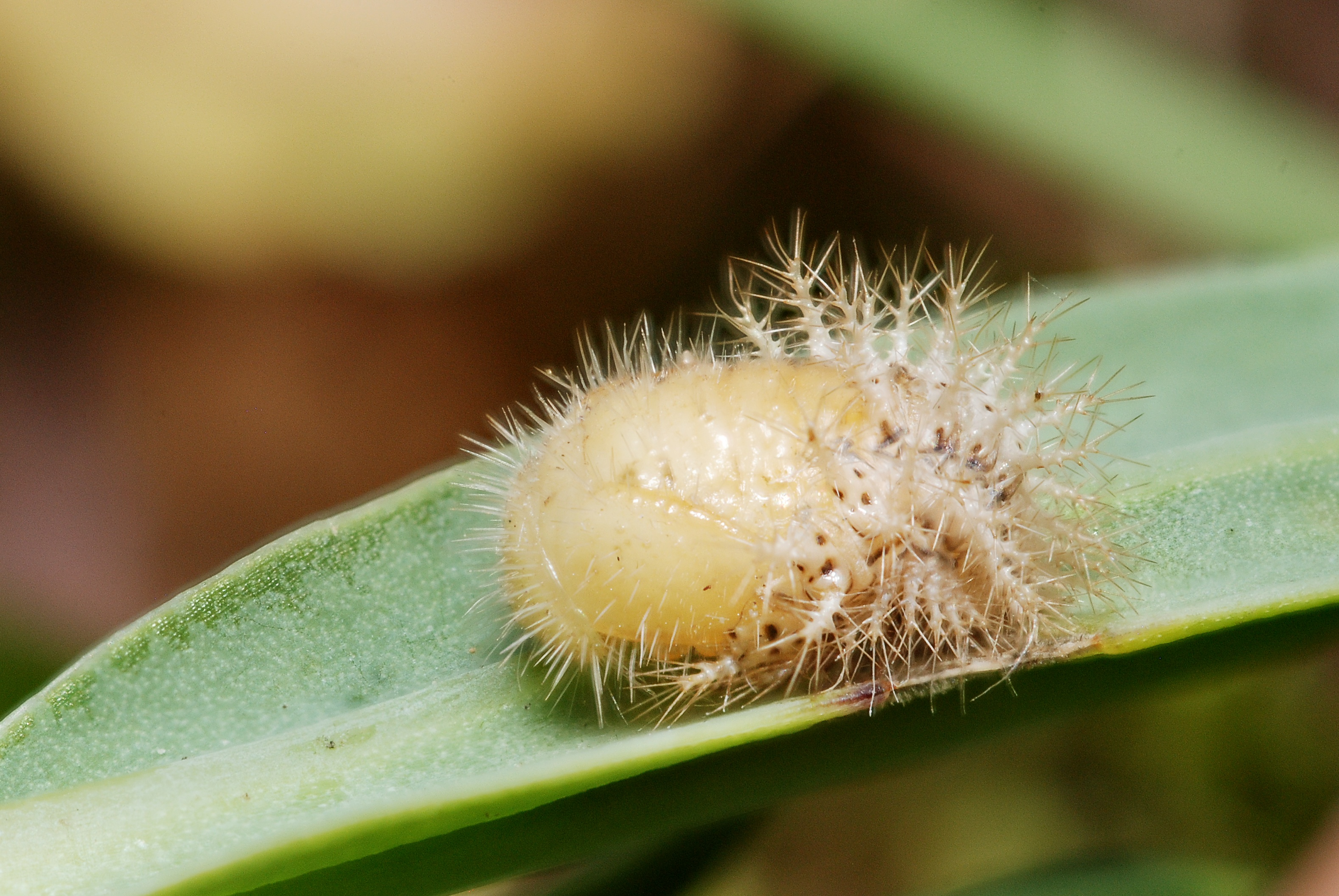
Pupa

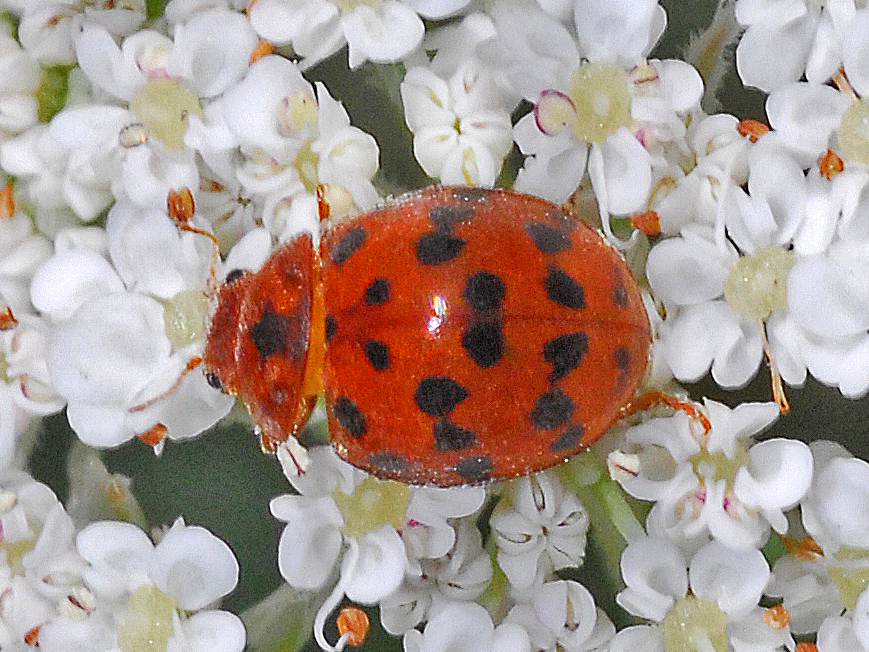
Imago on Apiaceae
