= Mada spinula =

Scientific classification
- Kingdom: Animalia
- Phylum: Arthropoda
- Class: Insecta
- Order: Coleoptera
- Suborder: Polyphaga
- Infraorder: Cucujiformia
- Family: Coccinellidae
- Genus: Mada
- Species: M. spinula

Binomial name
- Mada spinula Gordon, 1975

Species of beetle

Mada spinula is a species of beetle of the family Coccinellidae. It is found in Colombia.

== Description ==
Adults reach a length of about 3.65–4.61 mm. Adults are similar to Mada deyrollei, but the head is brownish yellow, the pronotum is black with piceous anterior margin and a brownish yellow lateral margin and the elytron is bluish black with a reddish piceous lateral margin.
