= Damatula yurimagi =

Scientific classification
- Kingdom: Animalia
- Phylum: Arthropoda
- Class: Insecta
- Order: Coleoptera
- Suborder: Polyphaga
- Infraorder: Cucujiformia
- Family: Coccinellidae
- Genus: Damatula
- Species: D. yurimagi

Binomial name
- Damatula yurimagi Gordon, 1975

Species of beetle

Damatula yurimagi is a species of beetle of the family Coccinellidae. It is found in Brazil.

== Description ==
Adults reach a length of about 5 mm. Adults are similar to Lorma rufoventris, but have a bluish black colour and the anterolateral angle of the pronotum and the head are reddish brown.
