= Damatula fairmairii =

Scientific classification
- Kingdom: Animalia
- Phylum: Arthropoda
- Class: Insecta
- Order: Coleoptera
- Suborder: Polyphaga
- Infraorder: Cucujiformia
- Family: Coccinellidae
- Genus: Damatula
- Species: D. fairmairii

Binomial name
- Damatula fairmairii (Mulsant, 1850)

Synonyms
- Epilachna fairmairii Mulsant, 1850

Species of beetle

Damatula fairmairii is a species of beetle of the family Coccinellidae. It is found in Brazil.

== Description ==
Adults reach a length of about 5.10–5.34 mm. Adults are similar to Damatula carnegiana.
