= Damatula disjuncta =

Scientific classification
- Kingdom: Animalia
- Phylum: Arthropoda
- Class: Insecta
- Order: Coleoptera
- Suborder: Polyphaga
- Infraorder: Cucujiformia
- Family: Coccinellidae
- Genus: Damatula
- Species: D. disjuncta

Binomial name
- Damatula disjuncta Gordon, 1975

Species of beetle

Damatula disjuncta is a species of beetle of the family Coccinellidae. It is found in Brazil.

== Description ==
Adults reach a length of about 3.95 mm. Adults are similar to Mada deyrollei, but the pronotum is black with a piceous anterior margin and a brownish yellow lateral margin and the elytron is bluish black.
