= Mada amplexata =

Scientific classification
- Kingdom: Animalia
- Phylum: Arthropoda
- Class: Insecta
- Order: Coleoptera
- Suborder: Polyphaga
- Infraorder: Cucujiformia
- Family: Coccinellidae
- Genus: Mada
- Species: M. amplexata

Binomial name
- Mada amplexata (Mulsant, 1850)

Synonyms
- Epilachna amplexata Mulsant, 1850

Species of beetle

Mada amplexata is a species of beetle of the family Coccinellidae. It is found in Mexico.

== Description ==
Adults reach a length of about 5.75 mm. Adults are black, while the lateral margin of the pronotum is yellow. The elytron is dark red with black lateral and sutural borders.
