= Lorma haliki =

Scientific classification
- Kingdom: Animalia
- Phylum: Arthropoda
- Class: Insecta
- Order: Coleoptera
- Suborder: Polyphaga
- Infraorder: Cucujiformia
- Family: Coccinellidae
- Genus: Lorma
- Species: L. haliki

Binomial name
- Lorma haliki Gordon, 1975

Species of beetle

Lorma haliki is a species of beetle of the family Coccinellidae. It is found in Brazil.

== Description ==
Adults reach a length of about 4-5.23 mm. Adults are yellowish brown, while the median one-third of the pronotum is black. The elytron is reddish brown with a black border.
