= Lorma glaucina =

Scientific classification
- Kingdom: Animalia
- Phylum: Arthropoda
- Class: Insecta
- Order: Coleoptera
- Suborder: Polyphaga
- Infraorder: Cucujiformia
- Family: Coccinellidae
- Genus: Lorma
- Species: L. glaucina

Binomial name
- Lorma glaucina (Mulsant, 1850)

Synonyms
- Epilachna glaucina Mulsant, 1850

Species of beetle

Lorma glaucina is a species of beetle in the family Coccinellidae. It is found in Brazil.

== Description ==
Adults reach a length of about 4.6 millimetres (0.18 in). Adults are piceous, while the anterior two-thirds of the head, legs and anterolateral angle of the pronotum are brownish yellow. The elytron is bluish black.
