= Mada amydra =

Scientific classification
- Kingdom: Animalia
- Phylum: Arthropoda
- Class: Insecta
- Order: Coleoptera
- Suborder: Polyphaga
- Infraorder: Cucujiformia
- Family: Coccinellidae
- Genus: Mada
- Species: M. amydra

Binomial name
- Mada amydra Gordon, 1975

Species of beetle

Mada amydra is a species of beetle of the family Coccinellidae. It is found in Panama.

== Description ==
Adults reach a length of about 4.08 mm. Adults are yellow, while the median area of the pronotum is reddish brown. The elytron has a yellow lateral border and a piceous border inside this yellow border. The disk of the elytron is reddish brown.
