= Mada nexophallus =

Scientific classification
- Kingdom: Animalia
- Phylum: Arthropoda
- Class: Insecta
- Order: Coleoptera
- Suborder: Polyphaga
- Infraorder: Cucujiformia
- Family: Coccinellidae
- Genus: Mada
- Species: M. nexophallus

Binomial name
- Mada nexophallus Gordon, 1975

Species of beetle

Mada nexophallus is a species of beetle of the family Coccinellidae. It is found in Peru.

== Description ==
Adults reach a length of about 5-5.48 mm. Adults are brownish yellow, while the lateral margin of the pronotum is yellow. The elytron is red with a bluish black border.
