= Damatula porioides =

Scientific classification
- Kingdom: Animalia
- Phylum: Arthropoda
- Class: Insecta
- Order: Coleoptera
- Suborder: Polyphaga
- Infraorder: Cucujiformia
- Family: Coccinellidae
- Genus: Damatula
- Species: D. porioides

Binomial name
- Damatula porioides (Weise, 1900)

Synonyms
- Mada porioides Weise, 1900

Species of beetle

Damatula porioides is a species of beetle of the family Coccinellidae. It is found in Colombia.

== Description ==
Adults reach a length of about 5.20–5.39 mm. Adults are yellowish brown, while the median area of the pronotum and parts of the head are bluish black. The elytron is also bluish black.
