= Malata mitis =

Scientific classification
- Kingdom: Animalia
- Phylum: Arthropoda
- Class: Insecta
- Order: Coleoptera
- Suborder: Polyphaga
- Infraorder: Cucujiformia
- Family: Coccinellidae
- Genus: Malata
- Species: M. mitis

Binomial name
- Malata mitis (Mulsant, 1850)

Synonyms
- Epilachna mitis Mulsant, 1850

Species of beetle

Malata mitis is a species of beetle in the family Coccinellidae. It is found in Costa Rica, Guatemala and Mexico.

== Description ==
Adults reach a length of about 4.48-4.75 mm. Adults are brownish yellow. The median area of the pronotum is black and the elytron has a yellow lateral border, with a black border inside this yellow border.
