= Mada dissita =

Scientific classification
- Kingdom: Animalia
- Phylum: Arthropoda
- Class: Insecta
- Order: Coleoptera
- Suborder: Polyphaga
- Infraorder: Cucujiformia
- Family: Coccinellidae
- Genus: Mada
- Species: M. dissita

Binomial name
- Mada dissita Gordon, 1975

Species of beetle

Mada dissita is a species of beetle of the family Coccinellidae. It is found in Bolivia.

== Description ==
Adults reach a length of about 3.48 mm. Adults are yellow, while the median area of the pronotum is piceous. The elytron is brownish piceous with a reddish brown lateral margin.
