= Malata diekei =

Scientific classification
- Kingdom: Animalia
- Phylum: Arthropoda
- Class: Insecta
- Order: Coleoptera
- Suborder: Polyphaga
- Infraorder: Cucujiformia
- Family: Coccinellidae
- Genus: Malata
- Species: M. diekei

Binomial name
- Malata diekei Gordon, 1975

Species of beetle

Malata diekei is a species of beetle of the family Coccinellidae. It is found in Mexico (Tamaulipas).

== Description ==
Adults reach a length of about 3.81-4.43 mm. Adults are reddish yellow. The elytron has a yellow lateral border, with a piceous border inside the yellow.
