= Mada circumducta =

Scientific classification
- Kingdom: Animalia
- Phylum: Arthropoda
- Class: Insecta
- Order: Coleoptera
- Suborder: Polyphaga
- Infraorder: Cucujiformia
- Family: Coccinellidae
- Genus: Mada
- Species: M. circumducta

Binomial name
- Mada circumducta (Mulsant, 1850)

Synonyms
- Epilachna circumducta Mulsant, 1850

Species of beetle

Mada circumducta is a species of beetle of the family Coccinellidae. It is found in Brazil.

== Description ==
Adults reach a length of about 3 mm. Adults are reddish yellow. The pronotum has a median black band at the base and the elytron has a yellow lateral margin and black ring.
