= Damatula schwarzi =

Scientific classification
- Kingdom: Animalia
- Phylum: Arthropoda
- Class: Insecta
- Order: Coleoptera
- Suborder: Polyphaga
- Infraorder: Cucujiformia
- Family: Coccinellidae
- Genus: Damatula
- Species: D. schwarzi

Binomial name
- Damatula schwarzi Gordon, 1975

Species of beetle

Damatula schwarzi is a species of beetle of the family Coccinellidae. It is found in Panama.

== Description ==
Adults typically measure about 3.79–4.55 mm in length. They are yellowish brown with a reddish-brown head. The pronotum is piceous with a yellowish brown lateral margin, and the elytron is brownish piceous with a faint reddish-brown spot.
