= Lorma apicalis =

Scientific classification
- Kingdom: Animalia
- Phylum: Arthropoda
- Class: Insecta
- Order: Coleoptera
- Suborder: Polyphaga
- Infraorder: Cucujiformia
- Family: Coccinellidae
- Genus: Lorma
- Species: L. apicalis

Binomial name
- Lorma apicalis Gordon, 1975

Species of beetle

Lorma apicalis is a species of beetle of the family Coccinellidae. It is found in Colombia.

== Description ==
Adults reach a length of about 3.35–4.38 mm. Adults are reddish yellow, while the head and pronotum are reddish brown. The elytron is bluish black with piceous lateral and sutural margins. The apical one-seventh of the elytron is yellow.
