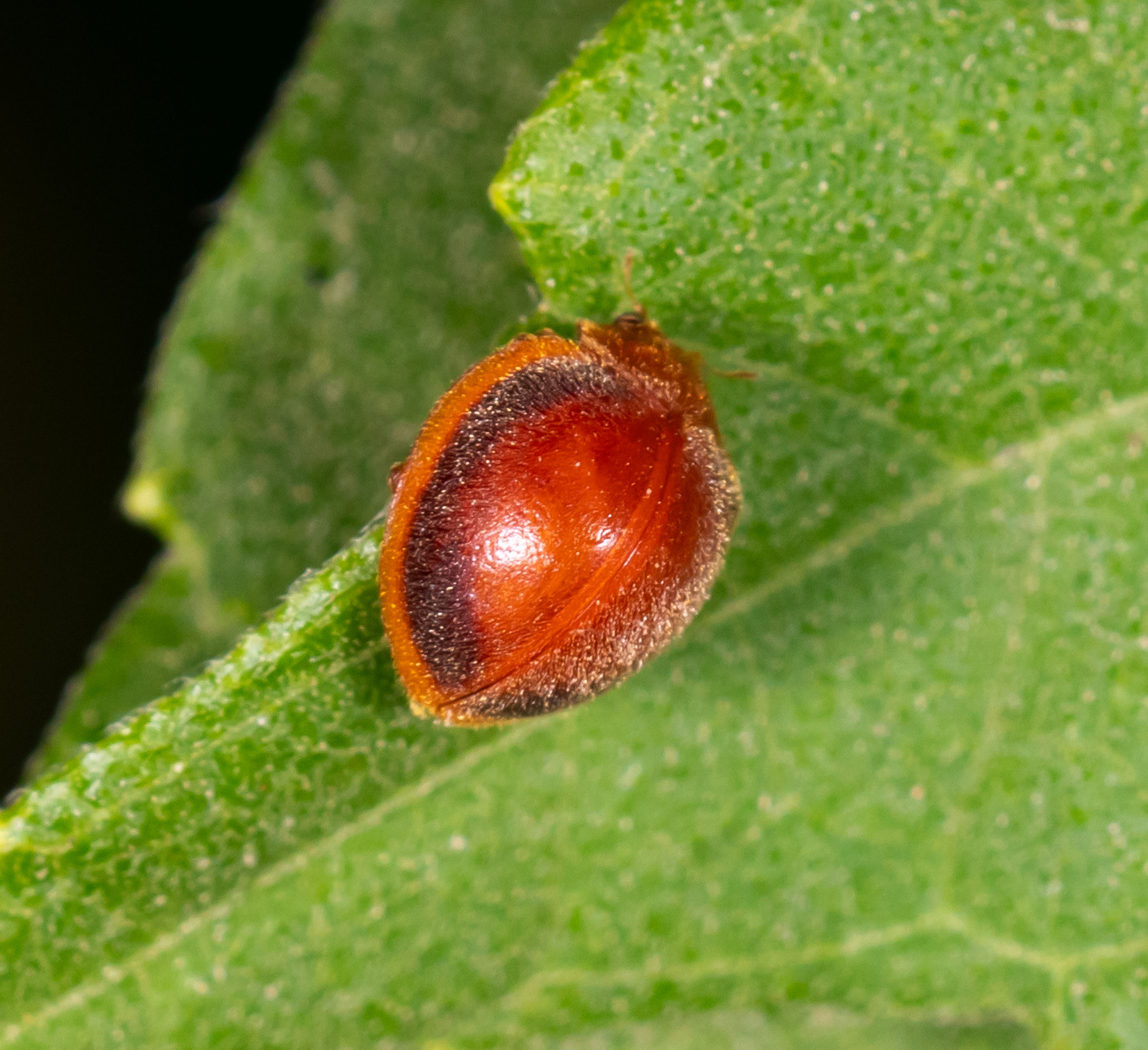
- M. contempta in Peru

Scientific classification
- Kingdom: Animalia
- Phylum: Arthropoda
- Class: Insecta
- Order: Coleoptera
- Suborder: Polyphaga
- Infraorder: Cucujiformia
- Family: Coccinellidae
- Genus: Mada
- Species: M. contempta

Binomial name
- Mada contempta (Mulsant, 1850)

Synonyms
- Epilachna contempta Mulsant, 1850

= Mada contempta =

Species of beetle

Mada contempta is a species of beetle of the family Coccinellidae. It is found in Brazil.

== Description ==
Adults reach a length of about 5.18-6 mm. Adults are yellow, while the median area of the pronotum is black. The elytron has a lateral yellow ring and a median black ring. The area between the black ring and suture is reddish brown.
