= Mada inepta =

Scientific classification
- Kingdom: Animalia
- Phylum: Arthropoda
- Class: Insecta
- Order: Coleoptera
- Suborder: Polyphaga
- Infraorder: Cucujiformia
- Family: Coccinellidae
- Genus: Mada
- Species: M. inepta

Binomial name
- Mada inepta (Gorham, 1898)

Synonyms
- Epilachna inepta Gorham, 1898; Mada durantae González & Gómez, 2013

Species of beetle

Mada inepta is a species of beetle of the family Coccinellidae. It is found in Colombia, Costa Rica and Mexico.

== Description ==
Adults reach a length of about 4-5.26 mm. Adults are brownish yellow. The pronotum has two piceous spots and the elytron is brownish yellow with a piceous ring and a piceous spot.
