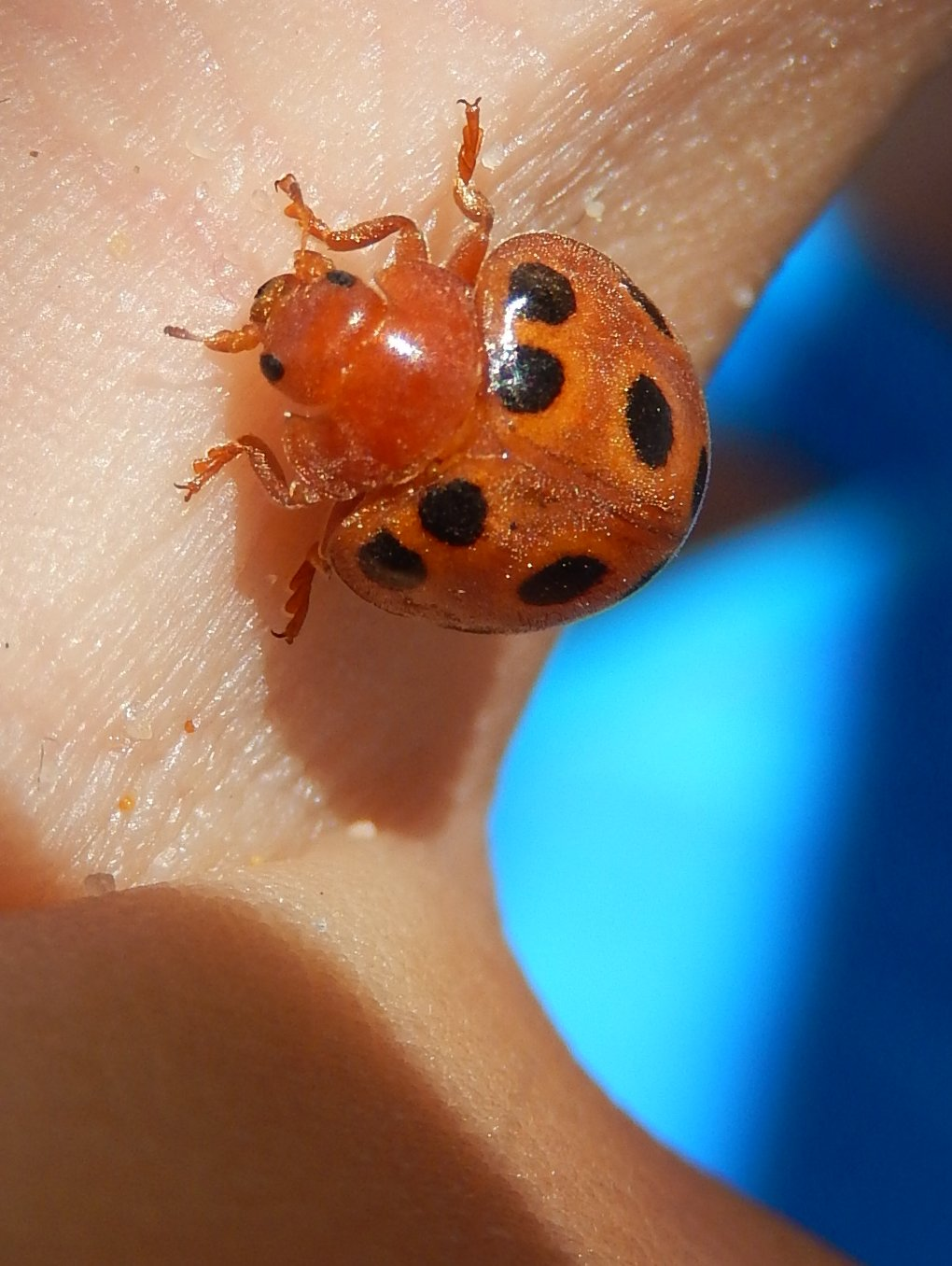
- Chnootriba elaterii

Scientific classification
- Domain: Eukaryota
- Kingdom: Animalia
- Phylum: Arthropoda
- Class: Insecta
- Order: Coleoptera
- Suborder: Polyphaga
- Infraorder: Cucujiformia
- Family: Coccinellidae
- Subfamily: Epilachninae
- Tribe: Epilachnini
- Genus: Chnootriba; Chevrolat, 1837

= Chnootriba =

Genus of beetles

Chnootriba is a genus of beetles belonging to the family Coccinellidae.

The species of this genus are found in Europe and Africa.

Species:

- Chnootriba elaterii
- Chnootriba pavonia (Olivier, 1808)
