= Damatula earina =

Scientific classification
- Kingdom: Animalia
- Phylum: Arthropoda
- Class: Insecta
- Order: Coleoptera
- Suborder: Polyphaga
- Infraorder: Cucujiformia
- Family: Coccinellidae
- Genus: Damatula
- Species: D. earina

Binomial name
- Damatula earina Gordon, 1975

Species of beetle

Damatula earina is a species of beetle of the family Coccinellidae. It is found in Brazil.

== Description ==
Adults reach a length of about 5.40 mm. Adults are yellowish brown with a partly greenish black head. The pronotum is greenish black with a pale anterolateral angle and the elytron is entirely greenish black.
