= Mada fraterna =

Scientific classification
- Kingdom: Animalia
- Phylum: Arthropoda
- Class: Insecta
- Order: Coleoptera
- Suborder: Polyphaga
- Infraorder: Cucujiformia
- Family: Coccinellidae
- Genus: Mada
- Species: M. fraterna

Binomial name
- Mada fraterna (Mulsant, 1850)

Synonyms
- Epilachna fraterna Mulsant, 1850; Rodolia guinoni Mulsant, 1853

Species of beetle

Mada fraterna is a species of beetle of the family Coccinellidae. It is found in French Guiana.

== Description ==
Adults reach a length of about 4-4.40 mm. Adults are pale yellowish brown, while the pronotum is dark reddish brown with a paler anterolateral angle.
