= Lorma sicardi =

Scientific classification
- Kingdom: Animalia
- Phylum: Arthropoda
- Class: Insecta
- Order: Coleoptera
- Suborder: Polyphaga
- Infraorder: Cucujiformia
- Family: Coccinellidae
- Genus: Lorma
- Species: L. sicardi

Binomial name
- Lorma sicardi Gordon, 1975

Species of beetle

Lorma sicardi is a species of beetle of the family Coccinellidae. It is found in Bolivia.

== Description ==
Adults reach a length of about 4.11 mm. Adults are pale reddish brown, while the posterior one-third of the head, the median area of the pronotum and the entire elytron are black.
