= Mada desarmata =

Scientific classification
- Kingdom: Animalia
- Phylum: Arthropoda
- Class: Insecta
- Order: Coleoptera
- Suborder: Polyphaga
- Infraorder: Cucujiformia
- Family: Coccinellidae
- Genus: Mada
- Species: M. desarmata

Binomial name
- Mada desarmata (Mulsant, 1850)

Synonyms
- Ladoria desarmata Mulsant, 1850

Species of beetle

Mada desarmata is a species of beetle of the family Coccinellidae. It is found in Brazil.

== Description ==
Adults reach a length of about 4.10 mm. Adults are yellowish brown, while the posterior half of the head is black. The pronotum is black, with the anterolateral angle and lateral margin brown. The elytron is black with a reddish piceous lateral border.
