= Mada insolitaphallus =

Scientific classification
- Kingdom: Animalia
- Phylum: Arthropoda
- Class: Insecta
- Order: Coleoptera
- Suborder: Polyphaga
- Infraorder: Cucujiformia
- Family: Coccinellidae
- Genus: Mada
- Species: M. insolitaphallus

Binomial name
- Mada insolitaphallus Gordon, 1975

Species of beetle

Mada insolitaphallus is a species of beetle of the family Coccinellidae. It is found in Peru.

== Description ==
Adults reach a length of about 3 mm. Adults are yellow, while the median two-thirds of the pronotum are black. The elytron is orange with a black border.
