= Mada polluta =

Scientific classification
- Kingdom: Animalia
- Phylum: Arthropoda
- Class: Insecta
- Order: Coleoptera
- Suborder: Polyphaga
- Infraorder: Cucujiformia
- Family: Coccinellidae
- Genus: Mada
- Species: M. polluta

Binomial name
- Mada polluta (Mulsant, 1850)

Synonyms
- Epilachna polluta Mulsant, 1850; Epilachna patula var. nigripennis Weise, 1895

Species of beetle

Mada polluta is a species of beetle of the family Coccinellidae. It is found in Mexico.

== Description ==
Adults reach a length of about 4.48–5.88 mm. Adults are yellow and the pronotum has two piceous spots. The elytron is yellow with three piceous spots and a faint brownish yellow spot.
