= Mada flavomarginata =

Scientific classification
- Kingdom: Animalia
- Phylum: Arthropoda
- Class: Insecta
- Order: Coleoptera
- Suborder: Polyphaga
- Infraorder: Cucujiformia
- Family: Coccinellidae
- Genus: Mada
- Species: M. flavomarginata

Binomial name
- Mada flavomarginata Gordon, 1975

Species of beetle

Mada flavomarginata is a species of beetle of the family Coccinellidae. It is found in Panama.

== Description ==
Adults reach a length of about 3.61 mm. Adults are brownish yellow, while the median area of the pronotum is reddish brown. The elytron is reddish brown with a yellow lateral border.
