= Mada adusta =

Scientific classification
- Kingdom: Animalia
- Phylum: Arthropoda
- Class: Insecta
- Order: Coleoptera
- Suborder: Polyphaga
- Infraorder: Cucujiformia
- Family: Coccinellidae
- Genus: Mada
- Species: M. adusta

Binomial name
- Mada adusta Gordon, 1975

Species of beetle

Mada adusta is a species of beetle of the family Coccinellidae. It is found in Paraguay and Brazil.

== Description ==
Adults reach a length of about 4 mm. Adults are yellow. The median half of the pronotum is piceous and the elytron is black with a reddish piceous median area.
