= Mada synemia =

Scientific classification
- Kingdom: Animalia
- Phylum: Arthropoda
- Class: Insecta
- Order: Coleoptera
- Suborder: Polyphaga
- Infraorder: Cucujiformia
- Family: Coccinellidae
- Genus: Mada
- Species: M. synemia

Binomial name
- Mada synemia Gordon, 1975

Species of beetle

Mada synemia is a species of beetle of the family Coccinellidae. It is found in Ecuador.

== Description ==
Adults reach a length of about 3.99–5.83 mm. Adults are black, while the anterolateral angle of the pronotum is yellow. The elytron is orange with a black border.
