= Mada santaremae =

Scientific classification
- Kingdom: Animalia
- Phylum: Arthropoda
- Class: Insecta
- Order: Coleoptera
- Suborder: Polyphaga
- Infraorder: Cucujiformia
- Family: Coccinellidae
- Genus: Mada
- Species: M. santaremae

Binomial name
- Mada santaremae Gordon, 1975

Species of beetle

Mada santaremae is a species of beetle of the family Coccinellidae. It is found in Brazil.

== Description ==
Adults reach a length of about 3.65–4.61 mm. Adults are brownish yellow, with the median area of the pronotum reddish brown. The elytron is pale red.
