= Lorma imitator =

Scientific classification
- Kingdom: Animalia
- Phylum: Arthropoda
- Class: Insecta
- Order: Coleoptera
- Suborder: Polyphaga
- Infraorder: Cucujiformia
- Family: Coccinellidae
- Genus: Lorma
- Species: L. imitator

Binomial name
- Lorma imitator Gordon, 1975

Species of beetle

Lorma imitator is a species of beetle of the family Coccinellidae. It is found in Colombia.

== Description ==
Adults reach a length of about 3.89 mm. Adults are yellow, while the base of the head is black. The pronotum is black with a yellow lateral border and the elytron is dark brown with a paler lateral border.
