= Mada sanguinea =

Scientific classification
- Kingdom: Animalia
- Phylum: Arthropoda
- Class: Insecta
- Order: Coleoptera
- Suborder: Polyphaga
- Infraorder: Cucujiformia
- Family: Coccinellidae
- Genus: Mada
- Species: M. sanguinea

Binomial name
- Mada sanguinea (Brèthes, 1925)

Synonyms
- Solanophila sanguinea Brèthes, 1925; Epilachna amazona Weise, 1926

Species of beetle

Mada sanguinea is a species of beetle of the family Coccinellidae. It is found in Brazil and Peru.

== Description ==
Adults reach a length of about 3.65-4.61 mm. Adults are brownish yellow. The pronotum is black with a yellow anterolateral angle and lateral margin. The elytron is bluish black with a piceous lateral margin.
