= Mada pseudodamata =

Scientific classification
- Kingdom: Animalia
- Phylum: Arthropoda
- Class: Insecta
- Order: Coleoptera
- Suborder: Polyphaga
- Infraorder: Cucujiformia
- Family: Coccinellidae
- Genus: Mada
- Species: M. pseudodamata

Binomial name
- Mada pseudodamata Gordon, 1975

Species of beetle

Mada pseudodamata is a species of beetle of the family Coccinellidae. It is found in Bolivia.

== Description ==
Adults reach a length of about 6.18 mm. Adults are black, although the head is partly yellow. The anterolateral angle of the pronotum is also yellow and the elytron is red with a black lateral border.
