= Malata delphinae =

Scientific classification
- Kingdom: Animalia
- Phylum: Arthropoda
- Class: Insecta
- Order: Coleoptera
- Suborder: Polyphaga
- Infraorder: Cucujiformia
- Family: Coccinellidae
- Genus: Malata
- Species: M. delphinae

Binomial name
- Malata delphinae (Gorham, 1899)

Synonyms
- Ladoria delphinae Gorham, 1899

Species of beetle

Malata delphinae is a species of beetle of the family Coccinellidae. It is found in Mexico (Oaxaca).

== Description ==
Adults reach a length of about 3.85 mm. Adults are reddish brown. The median one-third of the pronotum is black and the elytron is bluish black with a reddish brown lateral margin.
