= Pseudodira clypealis =

Scientific classification
- Kingdom: Animalia
- Phylum: Arthropoda
- Class: Insecta
- Order: Coleoptera
- Suborder: Polyphaga
- Infraorder: Cucujiformia
- Family: Coccinellidae
- Genus: Pseudodira
- Species: P. clypealis

Binomial name
- Pseudodira clypealis Gordon, 1975

Species of beetle

Pseudodira clypealis is a species of beetle of the family Coccinellidae. It is found in Brazil.

== Description ==
Adults reach a length of about 6.23 mm. Adults are black, while the elytron is entirely greenish black.
