= Mada pseudofraterna =

Scientific classification
- Kingdom: Animalia
- Phylum: Arthropoda
- Class: Insecta
- Order: Coleoptera
- Suborder: Polyphaga
- Infraorder: Cucujiformia
- Family: Coccinellidae
- Genus: Mada
- Species: M. pseudofraterna

Binomial name
- Mada pseudofraterna Gordon, 1975

Species of beetle

Mada pseudofraterna is a species of beetle of the family Coccinellidae. It is found in French Guiana.

== Description ==
Adults reach a length of about 3.78–4.81 mm. Adults are reddish brown, while the lateral margin of the pronotum is yellowish brown.
