= Mada gounellei =

Scientific classification
- Kingdom: Animalia
- Phylum: Arthropoda
- Class: Insecta
- Order: Coleoptera
- Suborder: Polyphaga
- Infraorder: Cucujiformia
- Family: Coccinellidae
- Genus: Mada
- Species: M. gounellei

Binomial name
- Mada gounellei Gordon, 1975

Species of beetle

Mada gounellei is a species of beetle of the family Coccinellidae. It is found in Brazil.

== Description ==
Adults reach a length of about 3.72–4.31 mm. Adults are yellow, while the median area of the pronotum is piceous. The elytron has five rings. The first is yellow, the second is piceous, the third is reddish yellow, the fourth ring is located on the disk and the fifth ring consists of a reddish-yellow area.
