= Mada circumflua =

Scientific classification
- Kingdom: Animalia
- Phylum: Arthropoda
- Class: Insecta
- Order: Coleoptera
- Suborder: Polyphaga
- Infraorder: Cucujiformia
- Family: Coccinellidae
- Genus: Mada
- Species: M. circumflua

Binomial name
- Mada circumflua (Mulsant, 1850)

Synonyms
- Epilachna circumflua Mulsant, 1850

Species of beetle

Mada circumflua is a species of beetle of the family Coccinellidae. It is found in Brazil.

== Description ==
Adults reach a length of about 4.28–5.38 mm. Adults are brownish yellow, while the disk of the pronotum is reddish yellow. The elytron has a yellow lateral margin and a black ring.
