= Lorma paprzyckii =

Scientific classification
- Kingdom: Animalia
- Phylum: Arthropoda
- Class: Insecta
- Order: Coleoptera
- Suborder: Polyphaga
- Infraorder: Cucujiformia
- Family: Coccinellidae
- Genus: Lorma
- Species: L. paprzyckii

Binomial name
- Lorma paprzyckii Gordon, 1975

Species of beetle

Lorma paprzyckii is a species of beetle of the family Coccinellidae. It is found in Peru.

== Description ==
Adults reach a length of about 3.81-4.65 mm. Adults are yellow, while the median one-third of the pronotum is reddish brown and the elytron is light reddish brown with a yellow lateral margin, as well as a dark brown vitta inside this yellow margin.
