= Lorma sopita =

Scientific classification
- Kingdom: Animalia
- Phylum: Arthropoda
- Class: Insecta
- Order: Coleoptera
- Suborder: Polyphaga
- Infraorder: Cucujiformia
- Family: Coccinellidae
- Genus: Lorma
- Species: L. sopita

Binomial name
- Lorma sopita Gordon, 1975

Species of beetle

Lorma sopita is a species of beetle in the family Coccinellidae. It is found in Panama.

== Description ==
Adults reach a length of about 4.10-4.50 mm. Adults are yellow, while the median one-third of the pronotum is black and the elytron is black with a dark brown lateral border.
