= Mada apada =

Scientific classification
- Kingdom: Animalia
- Phylum: Arthropoda
- Class: Insecta
- Order: Coleoptera
- Suborder: Polyphaga
- Infraorder: Cucujiformia
- Family: Coccinellidae
- Genus: Mada
- Species: M. apada

Binomial name
- Mada apada Gordon, 1975

Species of beetle

Mada apada is a species of beetle of the family Coccinellidae. It is found in French Guiana.

== Description ==
Adults reach a length of about 4 mm. Adults are light reddish brown, while the median area of the pronotum is dark reddish brown.
