= Lorma batesii =

Scientific classification
- Kingdom: Animalia
- Phylum: Arthropoda
- Class: Insecta
- Order: Coleoptera
- Suborder: Polyphaga
- Infraorder: Cucujiformia
- Family: Coccinellidae
- Genus: Lorma
- Species: L. batesii

Binomial name
- Lorma batesii (Crotch, 1874)

Synonyms
- Epilachna batesii Crotch, 1874

Species of beetle

Lorma batesii is a species of beetle in the family Coccinellidae. It is found in Brazil.

== Description ==
Adults reach a length of about 6.58-7.74 mm. Adults are reddish yellow. The pronotum has a red median area and the elytron is dark brown with a reddish tint. The lateral margin of the elytron has a reddish yellow border.
