= Mada elegans =

Scientific classification
- Kingdom: Animalia
- Phylum: Arthropoda
- Class: Insecta
- Order: Coleoptera
- Suborder: Polyphaga
- Infraorder: Cucujiformia
- Family: Coccinellidae
- Genus: Mada
- Species: M. elegans

Binomial name
- Mada elegans Gordon, 1975

Species of beetle

Mada elegans is a species of beetle of the family Coccinellidae. It is found in Peru.

== Description ==
Adults reach a length of about 4 mm. Adults are yellow, while the median basal area of the pronotum is black. The elytron is yellow with a black ring.
