= Damatula smarti =

Scientific classification
- Kingdom: Animalia
- Phylum: Arthropoda
- Class: Insecta
- Order: Coleoptera
- Suborder: Polyphaga
- Infraorder: Cucujiformia
- Family: Coccinellidae
- Genus: Damatula
- Species: D. smarti

Binomial name
- Damatula smarti Gordon, 1975

Species of beetle

Damatula smarti is a species of beetle of the family Coccinellidae. It is found in Brazil.

== Description ==
Adults reach a length of about 4.75 mm. Adults are brownish yellow, while the posterior half of the head and median two-thirds of the pronotum ae black. The elytron is bluish black.
