= Mada zonula =

Scientific classification
- Kingdom: Animalia
- Phylum: Arthropoda
- Class: Insecta
- Order: Coleoptera
- Suborder: Polyphaga
- Infraorder: Cucujiformia
- Family: Coccinellidae
- Genus: Mada
- Species: M. zonula

Binomial name
- Mada zonula (Mulsant, 1850)

Synonyms
- Epilachna zonula Mulsant, 1850

Species of beetle

Mada zonula is a species of beetle of the family Coccinellidae. It is found in Brazil.

== Description ==
Adults reach a length of about 4.38–4.66 mm. Adults are brownish yellow, while the head is partly black. The pronotum is yellow with a black basal area. The lateral margin of the elytron is yellow and there is a black border inside the yellow margin, as well as a brownish-yellow vitta extending to a black border at the apex. The sutural margin is chestnut brown.
