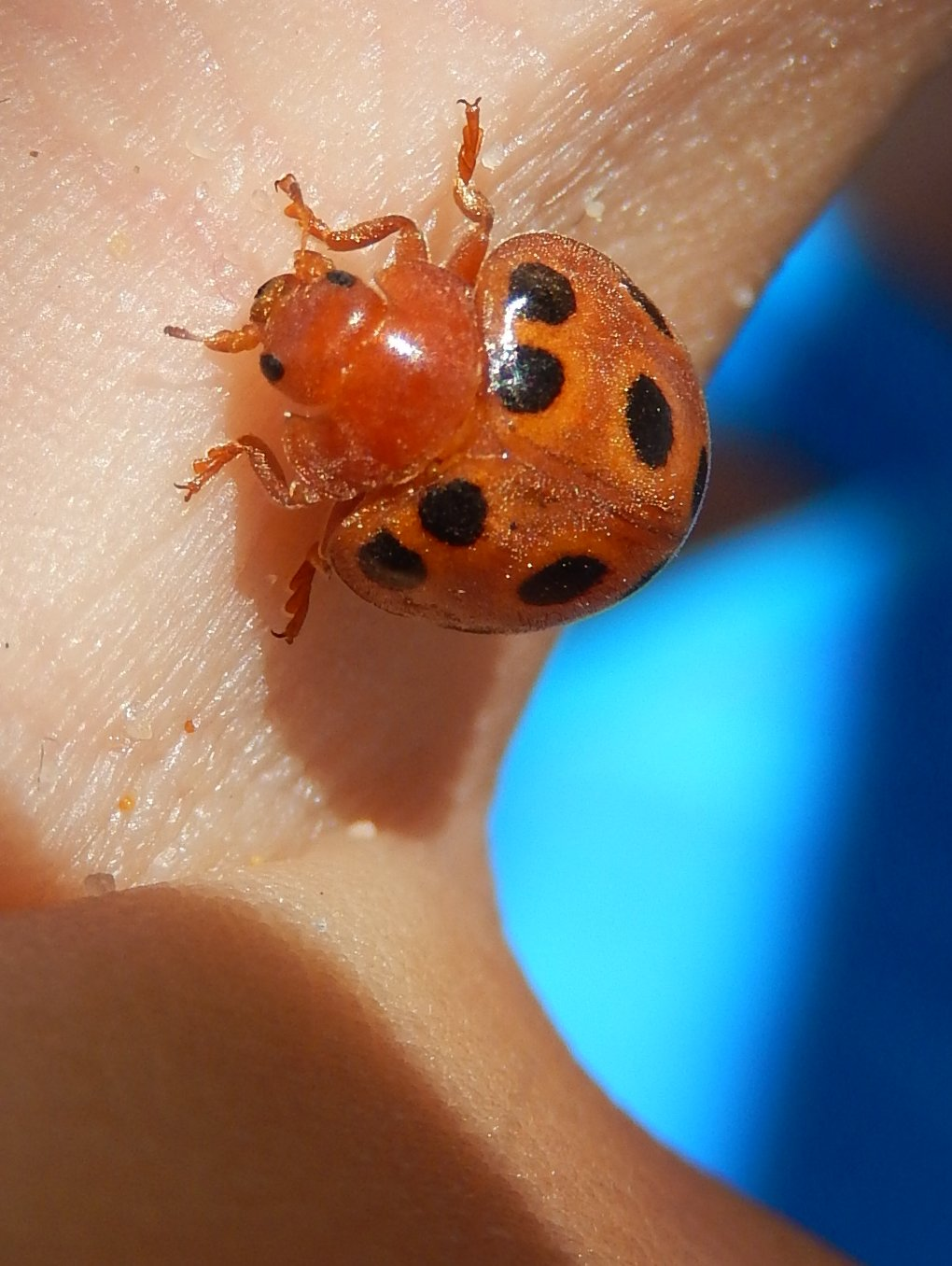

Scientific classification
- Kingdom: Animalia
- Phylum: Arthropoda
- Clade: Pancrustacea
- Class: Insecta
- Order: Coleoptera
- Suborder: Polyphaga
- Infraorder: Cucujiformia
- Family: Coccinellidae
- Genus: Chnootriba
- Species: C. elaterii

Binomial name
- Chnootriba elaterii (Rossi, 1794)

Synonyms
- Coccinella chrysomelina Fabricius, 1775; Epilachna chrysomelina (Fabricius, 1775); Coccinella elaterii Rossi, 1794; Henosepilachna elaterii (Rossi, 1794)

= Chnootriba elaterii =

Species of beetle

Chnootriba elaterii (formerly Henosepilachna elaterii), the melon ladybird beetle, is a phytophagous ladybird species found in southern Europe, Africa and western Asia. It feeds mainly on squirting cucumber, but also on other cultivated or spontaneous Cucurbitaceae plants.
