= Afidenta misera =

Scientific classification
- Kingdom: Animalia
- Phylum: Arthropoda
- Class: Insecta
- Order: Coleoptera
- Suborder: Polyphaga
- Infraorder: Cucujiformia
- Family: Coccinellidae
- Genus: Afidenta
- Species: A. misera

Binomial name
- Afidenta misera (Weise, 1900)

Synonyms
- Epilachna misera Weise, 1901; Afidenta mimetica Dieke, 1947

Species of beetle

Afidenta misera is a species of lady beetle widespread in the Oriental region.

== Biology ==
It is considered a serious pest of leguminous crops. Both larvae and adults are known to feed on Phaseolus vulgaris and Glycine max. Adults appeared in the fields in March, when the plants are small. Adult female lays eggs by the end of March or early April. Highest infestation occurs during April to June. It produces 3 to 4 generations per year. The duration of the egg stage is about 6 and larval stage from first instar to fourth instar lasted for 13 days. The prepupal duration is about 2 days and the pupal stage is about 6 days.

The mating lasted from 5 to 60 minutes. The preoviposition period is about 8 to 17 days. During oviposition, female lays eggs singly, or up to ten eggs together, on the leaf surface or in tendrils of host plants. Eggs are flat on host leaves, or sometimes attached to or inserted into tendrils. Initial color of the eggs is light yellow, but gradually changes to gray before hatching.

Larva soft bodied, moderately elongated to oval. There are long horizontal projected spines all over the body. There are four scoli in a longitudinal row on each side of the head. Larva has three thoracic and nine abdominal segments of the body. Body thoracic and abdominal segments have six scoli. The 1Oth and llth segment with four scoli and the last segmental scolus is very short. When the pupation starts, scoli from the front side of the pre-pupa shed off. Pupae with black spots appearing on the dorsal whitish yellow surface.

Adult with a round, convex, and flat body. Body color is yellowish brown or brownish red. Elytron consists with six spots free from base, suture and margin.
