= Malata pseudomitis =

Scientific classification
- Kingdom: Animalia
- Phylum: Arthropoda
- Class: Insecta
- Order: Coleoptera
- Suborder: Polyphaga
- Infraorder: Cucujiformia
- Family: Coccinellidae
- Genus: Malata
- Species: M. pseudomitis

Binomial name
- Malata pseudomitis Gordon, 1975

Species of beetle

Malata pseudomitis is a species of beetle of the family Coccinellidae. It is found in Guatemala.

== Description ==
Adults reach a length of about 3.61 millimetres (0.142 in). Adults are yellow. The median one-third of the pronotum is black and the elytron has a yellow lateral margin and a curved piceous vitta. The disk of the elytron is brownish yellow.
