= Lorma specca =

Scientific classification
- Kingdom: Animalia
- Phylum: Arthropoda
- Clade: Pancrustacea
- Class: Insecta
- Order: Coleoptera
- Suborder: Polyphaga
- Infraorder: Cucujiformia
- Family: Coccinellidae
- Genus: Lorma
- Species: L. specca

Binomial name
- Lorma specca Gordon, 1975

Species of beetle

Lorma specca is a species of beetle of the family Coccinellidae. It is found in Panama.

== Description ==
Adults reach a length of about 3.47–3.89 mm. Adults are brownish yellow, while the median area of the pronotum is dark reddish brown. The elytron is dark with five yellow spots.
