= Malata apatela =

Scientific classification
- Kingdom: Animalia
- Phylum: Arthropoda
- Class: Insecta
- Order: Coleoptera
- Suborder: Polyphaga
- Infraorder: Cucujiformia
- Family: Coccinellidae
- Genus: Malata
- Species: M. apatela

Binomial name
- Malata apatela Gordon, 1975

Species of beetle

Malata apatela is a species of beetle of the family Coccinellidae. It is found in Guatemala.

== Description ==
Adults reach a length of about 4.41 mm. Adults are yellow. The median half of the pronotum is black and the elytron is black with a reddish brown lateral margin.
