= Mada concentrica =

Scientific classification
- Kingdom: Animalia
- Phylum: Arthropoda
- Class: Insecta
- Order: Coleoptera
- Suborder: Polyphaga
- Infraorder: Cucujiformia
- Family: Coccinellidae
- Genus: Mada
- Species: M. concentrica

Binomial name
- Mada concentrica (Weise, 1926)

Synonyms
- Epilachna concentrica Weise, 1926

Species of beetle

Mada concentrica is a species of beetle of the family Coccinellidae. It is found in Brazil.

== Description ==
Adults reach a length of about 3.77 mm. Adults are brownish yellow, while the medial area of the pronotum is brown. The elytron has four rings. The outer ring is yellow, the second is dark brown, the third is yellow, and the fourth ring is reddish brown.
