= Mada virgata =

Scientific classification
- Kingdom: Animalia
- Phylum: Arthropoda
- Class: Insecta
- Order: Coleoptera
- Suborder: Polyphaga
- Infraorder: Cucujiformia
- Family: Coccinellidae
- Genus: Mada
- Species: M. virgata

Binomial name
- Mada virgata (Mulsant, 1850)

Synonyms
- Epilachna virgata Mulsant, 1850

Species of beetle

Mada virgata is a species of beetle of the family Coccinellidae. It is found in Venezuela, Colombia, Panama and Costa Rica.

== Description ==
Adults reach a length of about 4-5.26 mm. Adults are yellow. The median area of the pronotum is brown and the elytron is reddish brown with a yellow lateral margin, a piceous ring and two piceous vittae.
