= Mada azyoides =

Scientific classification
- Kingdom: Animalia
- Phylum: Arthropoda
- Class: Insecta
- Order: Coleoptera
- Suborder: Polyphaga
- Infraorder: Cucujiformia
- Family: Coccinellidae
- Genus: Mada
- Species: M. azyoides

Binomial name
- Mada azyoides Gordon, 1975

Species of beetle

Mada azyoides is a species of beetle of the family Coccinellidae. It is found in Panama.

== Description ==
Adults reach a length of about 3.34 mm. Adults are yellow, while the posterior two-thirds of the head are black. The pronotum is bluish black with the lateral margin and anterolateral angle reddish brown. The elytron is bluish black.
