= Lorma nevermanni =

Scientific classification
- Kingdom: Animalia
- Phylum: Arthropoda
- Class: Insecta
- Order: Coleoptera
- Suborder: Polyphaga
- Infraorder: Cucujiformia
- Family: Coccinellidae
- Genus: Lorma
- Species: L. nevermanni

Binomial name
- Lorma nevermanni Gordon, 1975

Species of beetle

Lorma nevermanni is a species of beetle of the family Coccinellidae. It is found in Costa Rica.

== Description ==
Adults reach a length of about 4.55 mm. Adults are brownish red, while the anterolateral angle of the pronotum, head and legs are yellow. The elytron is brownish red with a yellow lateral and sutural margin.
