= Damatula biremis =

Scientific classification
- Kingdom: Animalia
- Phylum: Arthropoda
- Class: Insecta
- Order: Coleoptera
- Suborder: Polyphaga
- Infraorder: Cucujiformia
- Family: Coccinellidae
- Genus: Damatula
- Species: D. biremis

Binomial name
- Damatula biremis González, 2015

Species of beetle

Damatula biremis is a species of beetle of the family Coccinellidae. It is found in Ecuador.

== Description ==
Adults reach a length of about 3.5 mm. They have a brown head and the pronotum is also brown, but with yellow lateral edges and a diffuse anterior edge. The elytron is reddish-brown.
