= Damatula colombiana =

Scientific classification
- Kingdom: Animalia
- Phylum: Arthropoda
- Class: Insecta
- Order: Coleoptera
- Suborder: Polyphaga
- Infraorder: Cucujiformia
- Family: Coccinellidae
- Genus: Damatula
- Species: D. colombiana

Binomial name
- Damatula colombiana Gordon, 1975

Species of beetle

Damatula colombiana is a species of beetle of the family Coccinellidae. It is found in Colombia.

== Description ==
Adults reach a length of about 4.27 mm. Adults are brownish yellow with the head is yellow with the posterior half black. The pronotum is black with the lateral margin and anterior angle yellow and the elytron is purplish black.
