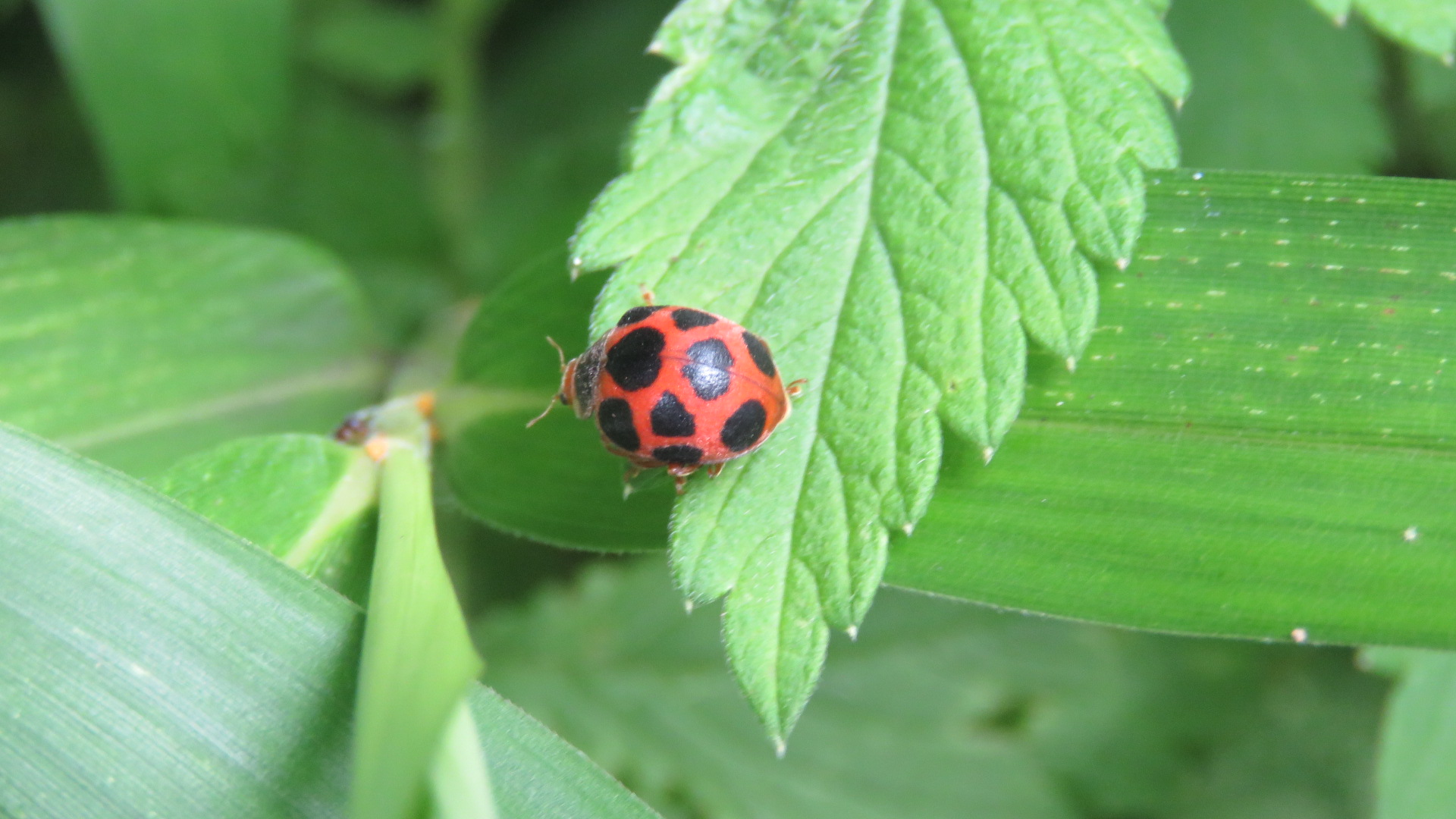
- D. admirabilis in Institute for Nature Study, National Museum of Nature and Science, Shirokane, Tokyo, Japan.

Scientific classification
- Kingdom: Animalia
- Phylum: Arthropoda
- Clade: Pancrustacea
- Class: Insecta
- Order: Coleoptera
- Suborder: Polyphaga
- Infraorder: Cucujiformia
- Family: Coccinellidae
- Genus: Diekeana
- Species: D. admirabilis

Binomial name
- Diekeana admirabilis (Crotch, 1874)

= Diekeana admirabilis =

Species of beetle

Diekeana admirabilis is a species of beetle in the family Coccinellidae, formerly placed in the genus Epilachna.
