= Mada rabauti =

Scientific classification
- Kingdom: Animalia
- Phylum: Arthropoda
- Class: Insecta
- Order: Coleoptera
- Suborder: Polyphaga
- Infraorder: Cucujiformia
- Family: Coccinellidae
- Genus: Mada
- Species: M. rabauti

Binomial name
- Mada rabauti Gordon, 1975

Species of beetle

Mada rabauti is a species of beetle of the family Coccinellidae. It is found in Brazil.

== Description ==
Adults reach a length of about 5.35 mm. Adults are yellow, while the median two-thirds of the pronotum are black. The elytron is black with a yellow lateral border.
