= Mada lineatopunctata =

Scientific classification
- Kingdom: Animalia
- Phylum: Arthropoda
- Class: Insecta
- Order: Coleoptera
- Suborder: Polyphaga
- Infraorder: Cucujiformia
- Family: Coccinellidae
- Genus: Mada
- Species: M. lineatopunctata

Binomial name
- Mada lineatopunctata (Germar, 1824)

Synonyms
- Coccinella lineatopunctata Germar, 1824

Species of beetle

Mada lineatopunctata is a species of beetle of the family Coccinellidae. It is found in Brazil.

== Description ==
Adults reach a length of about 5.10–5.99 mm (0.201–0.236 in). Adults are pale yellow. The elytron is pale yellow with piceous suture and six piceous markings.
