= Afidenta =

Scientific classification
- Kingdom: Animalia
- Phylum: Arthropoda
- Class: Insecta
- Order: Coleoptera
- Suborder: Polyphaga
- Infraorder: Cucujiformia
- Family: Coccinellidae
- Subfamily: Coccinellinae
- Tribe: Epilachnini
- Genus: Afidenta; Dieke, 1947

Genus of beetles

Afidenta is a genus of beetles in the family Coccinellidae.

== Species ==
- Afidenta alia
- Afidenta arisana
- Afidenta dahlbomi
- Afidenta dolosa
- Afidenta ephippiata
- Afidenta exagitata
- Afidenta flavomarginata
- Afidenta gyllenhalli
- Afidenta hafa
- Afidenta intermedia
- Afidenta inversa
- Afidenta kenyana
- Afidenta kwaiensis
- Afidenta maderi
- Afidenta mahalana
- Afidenta malawiensis
- Afidenta maotina
- Afidenta marginata
- Afidenta mediofasciata
- Afidenta meruensis
- Afidenta misera
- Afidenta muehlei
- Afidenta pauliani
- Afidenta pellex
- Afidenta razafimandimbyi
- Afidenta rhizobioides
- Afidenta rhombophora
- Afidenta rhombophoroides
- Afidenta saegeri
- Afidenta straelini
- Afidenta tetrastigma
- Afidenta tripartita
- Afidenta tsynadika
- Afidenta vazimba
- Afidenta vitabeata
- Afidenta zernyi
