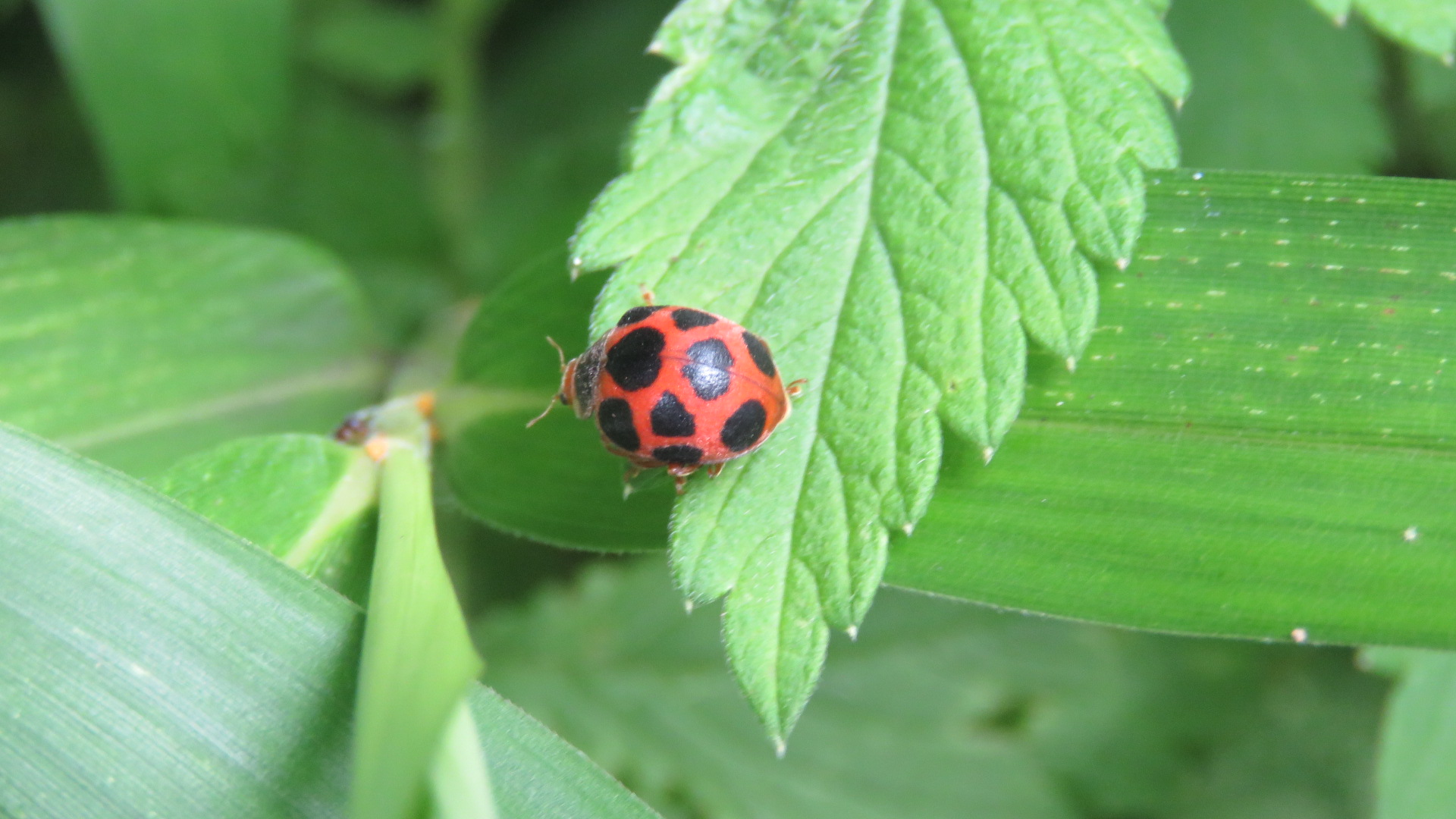
- Diekeana admirabilis

Scientific classification
- Domain: Eukaryota
- Kingdom: Animalia
- Phylum: Arthropoda
- Class: Insecta
- Order: Coleoptera
- Suborder: Polyphaga
- Infraorder: Cucujiformia
- Family: Coccinellidae
- Subfamily: Epilachninae
- Genus: Diekeana; Tomaszewska & Szawaryn, 2015

= Diekeana =

Genus of beetles

Diekeana is a genus of beetle in the family Coccinellidae, formerly included within the genus Epilachna.

== Selected species ==
- Diekeana admirabilis (Crotch, 1874)
- Diekeana alternans (Mulsant, 1850)
- Diekeana barisanensis Ohta-Matsubayashi & Katakura in Ohta-Matsubayashi et al., 2017
- Diekeana bocaki (Pang & Slipinski in Pang et al., 2012)
- Diekeana ciremaiensis Ohta-Matsubayashi & Katakura in Ohta-Matsubayashi et al., 2017
- Diekeana concuongensis (Hoang, 1978)
- Diekeana cyrtandrae Ohta-Matsubayashi & Katakura in Ohta-Matsubayashi et al., 2017
- Diekeana glochinosa (Pang & Mao, 1979)
- Diekeana gynostemmae Ohta-Matsubayashi & Katakura in Ohta-Matsubayashi et al., 2017
- Diekeana grayi Mulsant, 1850
- Diekeana insignis (Gorham, 1892)
- Diekeana isodontis Ohta-Matsubayashi & Katakura in Ohta-Matsubayashi et al., 2017
- Diekeana kerinciensis Ohta-Matsubayashi & Katakura in Ohta-Matsubayashi et al., 2017
- Diekeana macularis (Mulsant, 1850)
- Diekeana maxima (Weise, 1898)
- Diekeana parainsignis (Pang & Mao, 1979)
- Diekeana rasamensis Ohta-Matsubayashi & Katakura in Ohta-Matsubayashi et al., 2017
- Diekeana sundaensis Ohta-Matsubayashi & Katakura in Ohta-Matsubayashi et al., 2017
