= Chazeauiana =

Scientific classification
- Domain: Eukaryota
- Kingdom: Animalia
- Phylum: Arthropoda
- Class: Insecta
- Order: Coleoptera
- Suborder: Polyphaga
- Infraorder: Cucujiformia
- Family: Coccinellidae
- Subfamily: Epilachninae
- Genus: Chazeauiana; Tomaszewska & Szawaryn, 2015

Synonyms
- Epilachna (Cleta) Mulsant 1850 (Preocc.); Epilachna (Hypsa) Mulsant 1850 (Preocc.); Afrocleta Szawaryn & Tomaszewska 2020 (Unnecessary replacement)

Genus of beetles

Chazeauiana is a genus of beetle in the family Coccinellidae, formerly included within the genus Epilachna.

== Selected species ==
- Chazeauiana consignata (Weise, 1909)
- Chazeauiana coquereli (Sicard, 1907)
- Chazeauiana fulvohirta (Weise, 1895)
- Chazeauiana griveaudi (Chazeau, 1975)
- Chazeauiana gyldenstolpei (Weise, 1924)
- Chazeauiana nigrolimbata (Thomson, 1875)
- Chazeauiana vadoni (Chazeau, 1976)
