= Damatula carnegiana =

Scientific classification
- Kingdom: Animalia
- Phylum: Arthropoda
- Class: Insecta
- Order: Coleoptera
- Suborder: Polyphaga
- Infraorder: Cucujiformia
- Family: Coccinellidae
- Genus: Damatula
- Species: D. carnegiana

Binomial name
- Damatula carnegiana Gordon, 1975

Species of beetle

Damatula carnegiana is a species of beetle of the family Coccinellidae. It is found in Brazil.

== Description ==
Adults reach a length of about 4.71–5.10 mm. Adults are yellowish brown. The pronotum is bluish black with the anterolateral angle yellowish brown. The elytron is purplish black.
