= Lorma rufoventris =

Scientific classification
- Kingdom: Animalia
- Phylum: Arthropoda
- Class: Insecta
- Order: Coleoptera
- Suborder: Polyphaga
- Infraorder: Cucujiformia
- Family: Coccinellidae
- Genus: Lorma
- Species: L. rufoventris

Binomial name
- Lorma rufoventris (Mulsant, 1850)

Synonyms
- Epilachna rufoventris Mulsant, 1850

Species of beetle

Lorma rufoventris is a species of beetle of the family Coccinellidae. It is found in Brazil.

== Description ==
Adults reach a length of about 4–5.34 mm. Adults are black, while the anterolateral angle of the pronotum is yellow. The elytron is bluish black with piceous lateral and sutural margins. The apical one-seventh of the elytron is yellow.
