= Afissa =

Scientific classification
- Kingdom: Animalia
- Phylum: Arthropoda
- Clade: Pancrustacea
- Class: Insecta
- Order: Coleoptera
- Suborder: Polyphaga
- Infraorder: Cucujiformia
- Family: Coccinellidae
- Subfamily: Coccinellinae
- Tribe: Epilachnini
- Genus: Afissa; Dieke, 1947

Species
- See text

Synonyms
- Afilachna Bielawski, 1966; Afissula Kapur, 1958

Genus of ladybug beetle

Afissa is a genus of ladybug beetles that belongs to the tribe Epilachnini. Members of this genus can be found throughout Eurasia and Africa.

== Taxonomy ==
=== Taxonomic history ===
The genus was erected in 1947 by Gerhard Heinrich Dieke, a German-American physicist who was an expert on the taxonomy of ladybug beetles. When it was erected, the type species was Coccinella flavicollis which is now a synonym of Afissa flavicollis.

Due to similarities with the species Epilachna borealis, it would be synonymized with Epilachna in 1961 by C.S. Li and E.F. Cook. In 2015, Szawaryn et al. would resurrect the genus from synonymy with Epilachna based on phylogenetic analysis of the genus. Furthermore, they would also propose that most Asian species formerly classified as belonging to Epilachna were actually apart of genus Afissa.

=== Species ===
This genus contains numerous species. Below is a list of species that belong to this genus:

- Afissa ampliata (Pang & Mao, 1979)
- Afissa anhweiana Dieke, 1947
- Afissa antennata (Bielawski, 1967)
- Afissa burmana (Bielawski, 1967)
- Afissa chapaensis (Hoang, 1977)
- Afissa craspedotricha (Yu, 2004)
- Afissa cuonaensis Iqbal et al. 2024
- Afissa expansa Dieke, 1947
- Afissa flavicollis (Thunberg, 1781)
- Afissa flavimarginalis (Hoang, 1978)
- Afissa galerucinoides (Korschefsky, 1934)
- Afissa gedeensis Dieke, 1947
- Afissa gibbera (Crotch, 1874)
- Afissa hydrangeae (Pang & Mao, 1979)
- Afissa hyla (Bielawski, 1967)
- Afissa kambaitana (Bielawski, 1967)
- Afissa langpingensis Das et al. 2023
- Afissa max Pang et al., 2012
- Afissa merkli (Jadwiszczak, 1989)
- Afissa mysticoides (Sicard, 1913)
- Afissa nielamuensis (Pang & Mao, 1977)
- Afissa nonggangensis (Zeng & Yang, 1996)
- Afissa parvula (Crotch, 1874)
- Afissa plicata (Weise, 1889)
- Afissa puncta (Bielawski, 1967)
- Afissa rana (Kapur, 1958)
- Afissa sadonensis (Bielawski, 1967)
- Afissa sanscrita (Crotch, 1874)
- Afissa schawalleri Iqbal et al. 2024
- Afissa similbengalica Iqbal et al. 2024
- Afissa spatulata (Cao & Xiao, 1984)
- Afissa sureilica Das et al. 2023
- Afissa uniformis (Pang & Mao, 1979)
- Afissa xuexii Wang et al. 2025
- Afissa yunnanica (Cao & Wang, 1992)

== Distribution ==
This genus occurs throughout the continent of Eurasia and Africa. There have been more than 30 species that have been recorded from China. However the taxonomy of many Chinese species remains poorly studied and many species that were formerly assigned to Epilachna are in need of further examination.

== Description ==
The morphology and size of species belonging to Afissa vary greatly unlike genus Epilachna whose species are nearly homogeneous and hardly differ in morphology. Their spot patterns are also varied.

== Biology ==
Little is known about the biology of genus Afissa. They are apparently not a pest species which is due to their populations being low and their main plant food sources being of low economic importance.
