= Lorma =

Scientific classification
- Kingdom: Animalia
- Phylum: Arthropoda
- Clade: Pancrustacea
- Class: Insecta
- Order: Coleoptera
- Suborder: Polyphaga
- Infraorder: Cucujiformia
- Family: Coccinellidae
- Subfamily: Coccinellinae
- Tribe: Epilachnini
- Genus: Lorma; Gordon, 1975

Genus of beetles

Lorma is a genus of herbivorous Coccinellidae.

== Species ==
- Lorma apicalis Gordon, 1975
- Lorma batesii (Crotch, 1874)
- Lorma glaucina (Mulsant, 1850)
- Lorma haliki Gordon, 1975
- Lorma imitator Gordon, 1975
- Lorma nevermanni Gordon, 1975
- Lorma paprzyckii Gordon, 1975
- Lorma rufoventris (Mulsant, 1850)
- Lorma sicardi Gordon, 1975
- Lorma sopita Gordon, 1975
- Lorma specca Gordon, 1975
