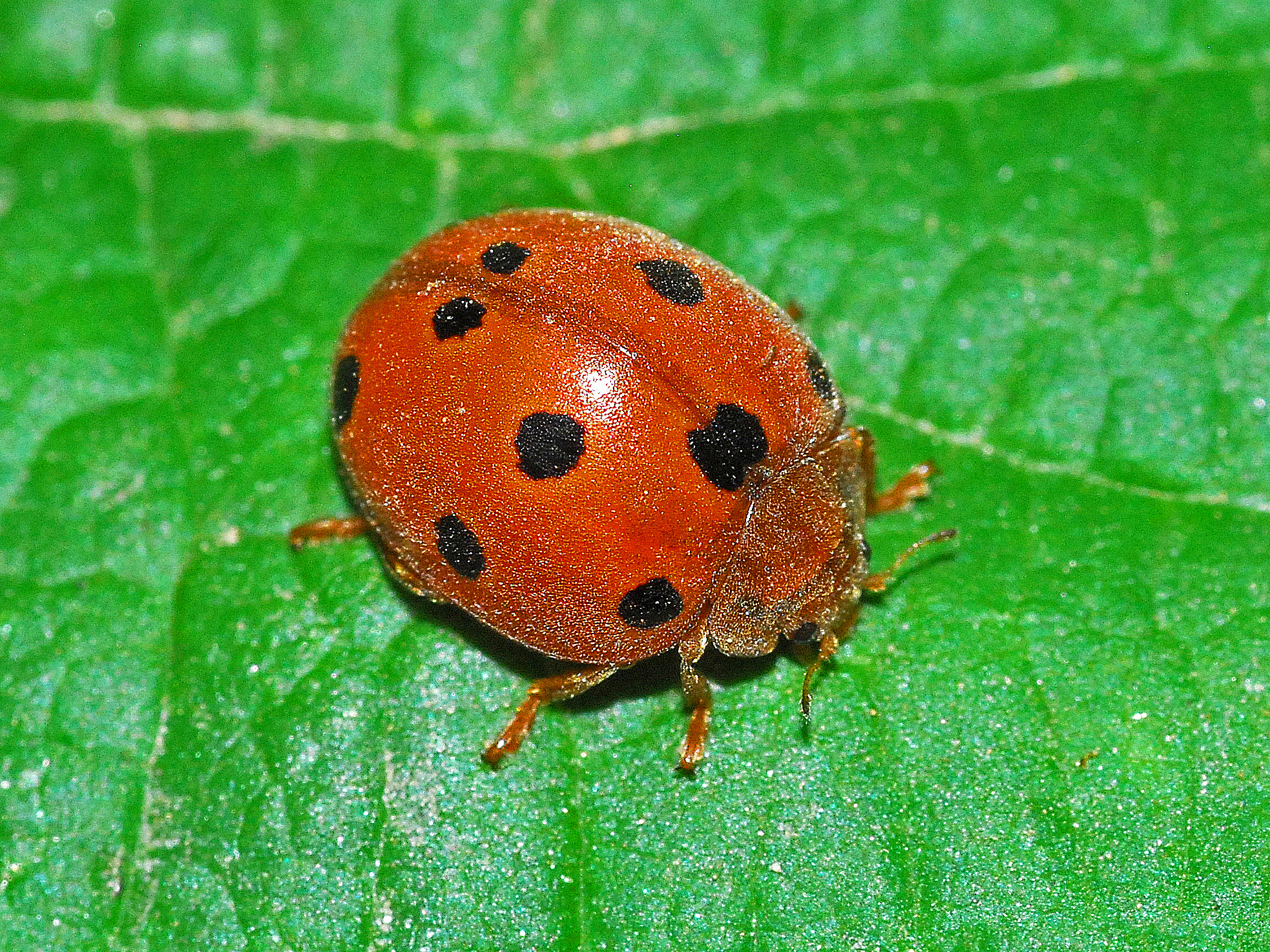
- Henosepilachna argus

Scientific classification
- Kingdom: Animalia
- Phylum: Arthropoda
- Clade: Pancrustacea
- Class: Insecta
- Order: Coleoptera
- Suborder: Polyphaga
- Infraorder: Cucujiformia
- Family: Coccinellidae
- Genus: Henosepilachna
- Species: H. argus

Binomial name
- Henosepilachna argus (Geoffroy in Fourcroy, 1762)

Synonyms
- Coccinella argus (Geoffroy in Fourcroy, 1762); Epilachna argus maroccana Kocher, 1953

= Henosepilachna argus =

Genus of beetles

Henosepilachna argus, common name bryony ladybird, is a species of beetle in the family Coccinellidae.

== Distribution and habitat ==
This species occurs in most of Europe (Portugal, Spain, France, Great Britain, Ireland, Switzerland, Austria, Belgium, the Netherlands, Germany, Italy, Czech Republic, Slovakia, Hungary, Croatia, Serbia, Montenegro, Romania and Bulgaria) and in the Afrotropical realm. These ladybugs can be found where the host plants are present, in hedges, herbaceous wasteland, forest clearings and sometimes even in dunes.

== Description ==
Henosepilachna argus can reach a body length of about 5–7 mm (0.20–0.28 in). These Ladybirds show an orange or orange-red background colour on pronotum and on the strongly arched elytra, with eleven black spots (five on each elytron and one common at the shield). The legs are orange colored in southern Europe. Elytra are covered with very fine, short and dense hair, that give them a matte to fluffy appearance, while usually ladybirds have smooth, shiny elytra.

== Biology ==
These ladybirds appear at the beginning of Spring (in March or April), they mate in May or June and disappear at the end of Summer. In fact they go to wintering grounds in September or October. They do not feed on aphids or other insects, but are phytophagus, mainly feeding on Squirting Cucumber (Ecballium elaterium), White Bryony (Bryonia dioica) and other Cucurbitaceae. They usually bite a leaf isolating a circular area, then they eat the leaf inside said area. This behavior probably reduces the amount of toxic compounds the plant directs toward the attacked zone. The yellow colored eggs are laid on the underside of the leaves of the host plants. The larvae hatch after around 12 to 14 days. The last-instar larvae are pale yellow with dark branching spines. Also pupae are pale yellow, with black spots and stronger black or whitish branching spines. Pupae overwinter in low herbage.

== Gallery ==
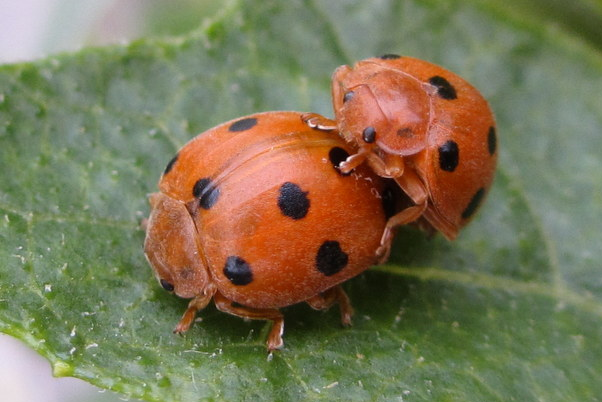
Mating couple

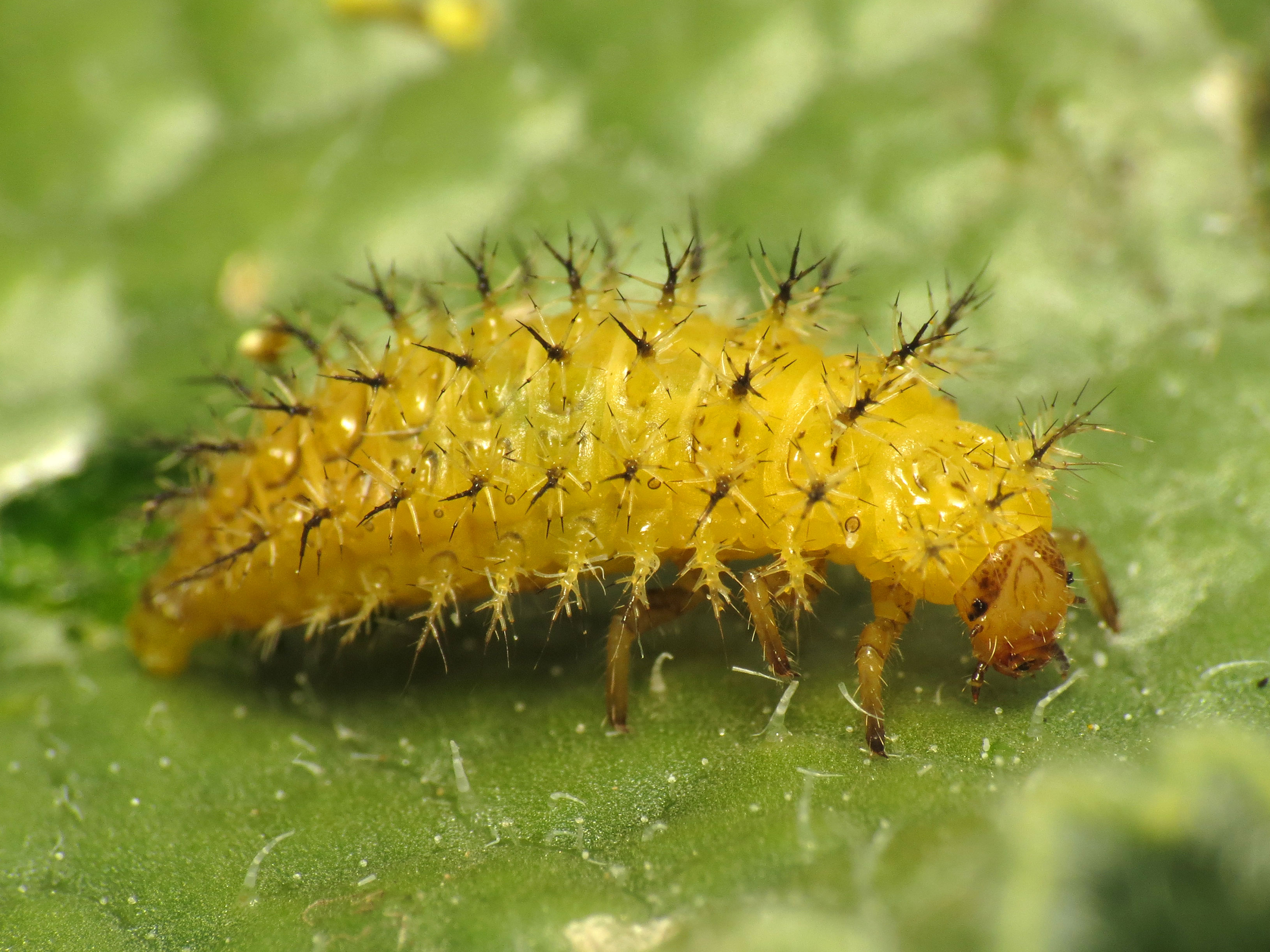
Fourth-instar larva

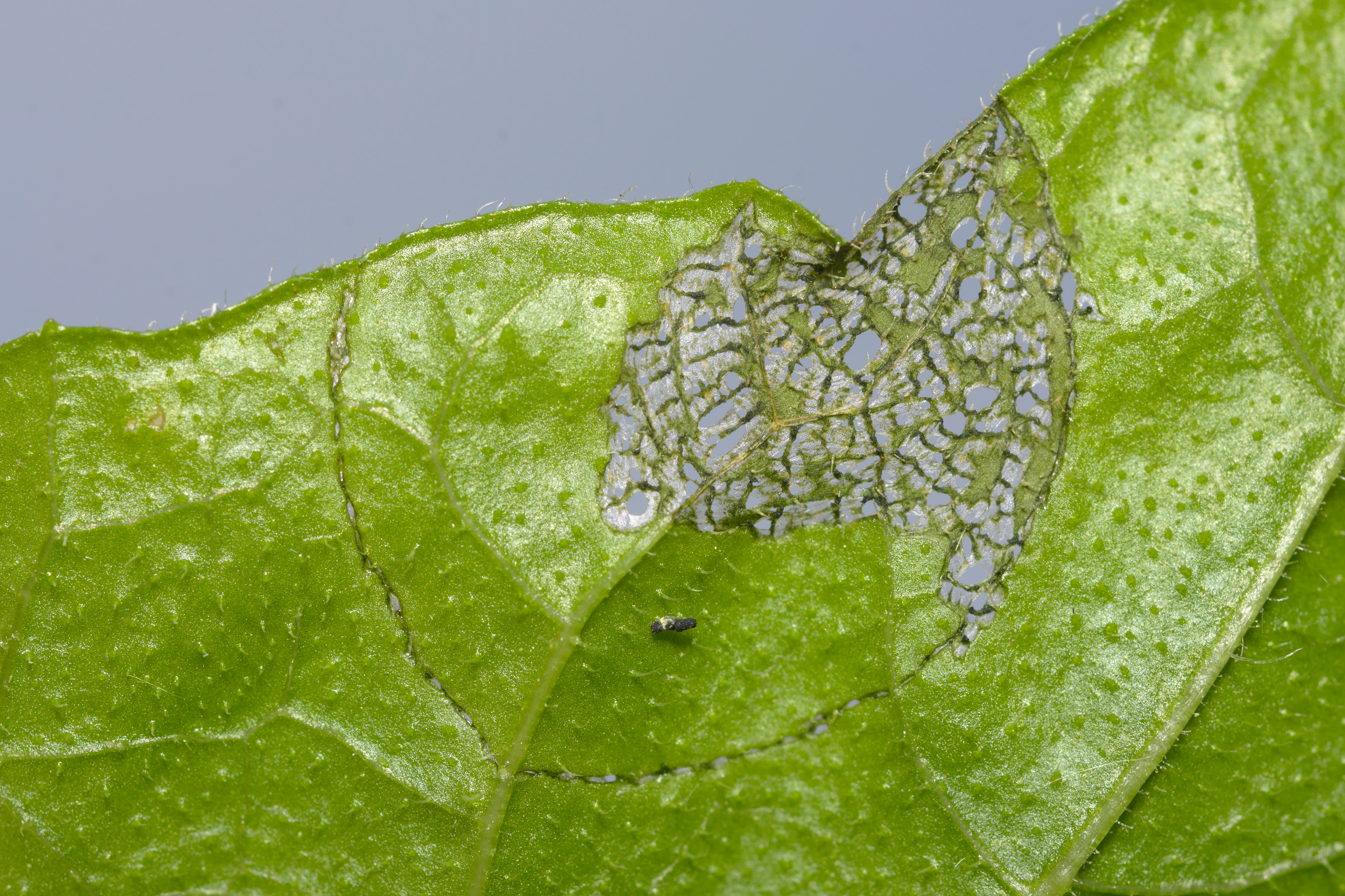
Typical feeding marks

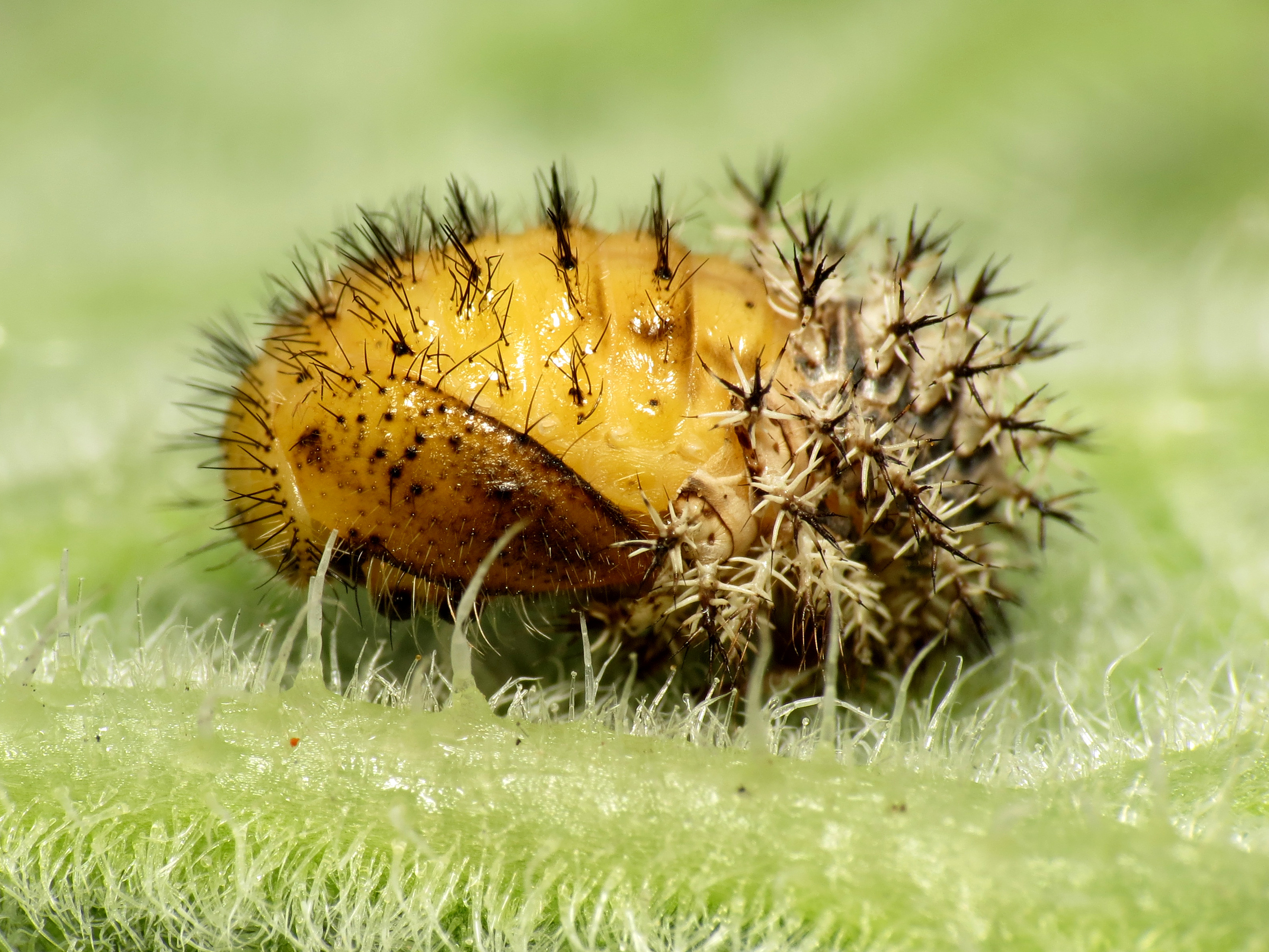
Pupa

== Bibliography ==
- Y. Le Monnier und A. Livory: Une enquête Manche-Nature: Atlas des Coccinelles de la Manche. Les Dossiers de Manche-Nature 5, 2003
- British Wildlife Magazine. Jahrgang 16, S. 286, Britisch Wildlife Publishing, 2004
- Menzies, I.S. & B.Spooner, B.M. (2000). Henosepilachna argus (Geoffroy) (Coccinellidae, Epilachninae), a phytophagous ladybird new to the U.K., breeding at Molesey, Surrey. The Coleopterist 9(1): 1.
- Prance, D.A. (2001). Henosepilachna argus (Geoffroy) (Coccinellidae) in Middlesex. The Coleopterist 10(1): 4.
- W. Wittsack: Zur Verbreitung und Ausbreitung von Hanosepilachna argus (Geoffroy) (Col., Coccinnelidae) in der DDR. Entomologische Nachrichten, 21, S. 1–7, 1977
