= Malata (beetle) =

Scientific classification
- Kingdom: Animalia
- Phylum: Arthropoda
- Class: Insecta
- Order: Coleoptera
- Suborder: Polyphaga
- Infraorder: Cucujiformia
- Family: Coccinellidae
- Subfamily: Coccinellinae
- Tribe: Epilachnini
- Genus: Malata; Gordon, 1975

Genus of beetles

Malata is a genus of beetles in the family Coccinellidae.

== Species ==
- Malata apatela Gordon, 1975
- Malata burgdorfi Gordon, 1975
- Malata delphinae (Gorham, 1899)
- Malata diekei Gordon, 1975
- Malata mitis (Mulsant, 1850)
- Malata pseudomitis Gordon, 1975
