= Damatula =

Scientific classification
- Kingdom: Animalia
- Phylum: Arthropoda
- Class: Insecta
- Order: Coleoptera
- Suborder: Polyphaga
- Infraorder: Cucujiformia
- Family: Coccinellidae
- Subfamily: Coccinellinae
- Tribe: Epilachnini
- Genus: Damatula; Gordon, 1975

Genus of beetles

Damatula is a genus of beetles in the family Coccinellidae.

== Species ==
- Damatula biremis González, 2015
- Damatula carnegiana Gordon, 1975
- Damatula colombiana Gordon, 1975
- Damatula disjuncta Gordon, 1975
- Damatula earina Gordon, 1975
- Damatula fairmairii (Mulsant, 1850)
- Damatula porioides (Weise, 1900)
- Damatula schwarzi Gordon, 1975
- Damatula smarti Gordon, 1975
- Damatula yurimagi Gordon, 1975
