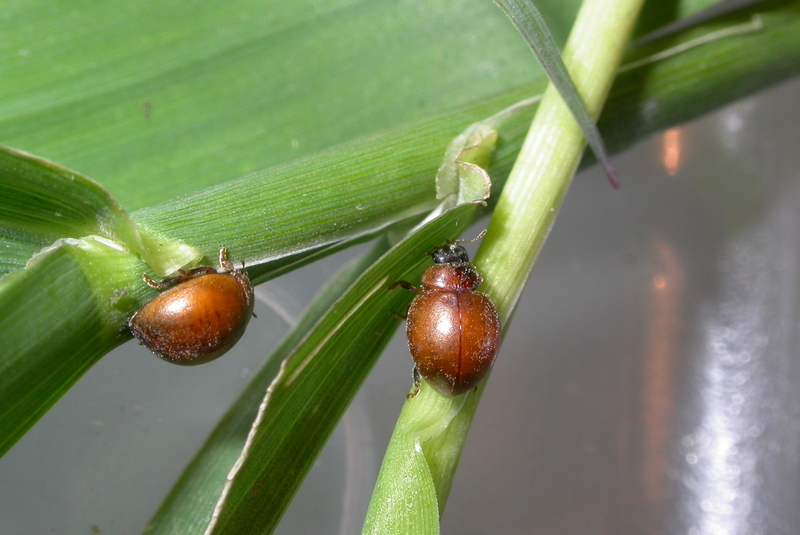

Scientific classification
- Kingdom: Animalia
- Phylum: Arthropoda
- Clade: Pancrustacea
- Class: Insecta
- Order: Coleoptera
- Suborder: Polyphaga
- Infraorder: Cucujiformia
- Family: Coccinellidae
- Genus: Cynegetis
- Species: C. impunctata

Binomial name
- Cynegetis impunctata (Linnaeus, 1767)

Synonyms
- Coccinella impunctata Linnaeus, 1767

= Cynegetis impunctata =

Species of beetle

Cynegetis impunctata is a species of ladybird native to continental Europe. In Germany it is known as the grass ladybird, unspotted ladybird or ochre ladybird.

== Description ==
The adult beetles are about 3 to 4.5 mm long, strongly domed and ochre-brown in colour. There are usually no spots, but some specimens have spots or may be darker in colour.

== Habitat ==
The species lives in damp meadows and woodlands.

== Diet ==
Adults and larvae are vegetarian and polyphagous, on grasses such as couch-grass (Elymus repens), false oat-grass (Arrhenatherum elatius) and reed canary-grass (Phalaris arundinacea).

== Distribution ==
It is found in Austria, Belgium, non-alpine Germany, Norway, Poland, Sweden, The Netherlands and less frequently in other countries. As of 2012 it is not reported from the British Isles.

== Literature ==
- Harde, Severa: Der Kosmos Käferführer, Die mitteleuropäischen Käfer, Franckh-Kosmos Verlags-GmbH & Co, Stuttgart 2000, ISBN 3-440-06959-1
