= Mada (beetle) =

Scientific classification
- Kingdom: Animalia
- Phylum: Arthropoda
- Class: Insecta
- Order: Coleoptera
- Suborder: Polyphaga
- Infraorder: Cucujiformia
- Family: Coccinellidae
- Subfamily: Coccinellinae
- Tribe: Epilachnini
- Genus: Mada; Mulsant, 1850

Synonyms
- Epilachna (Mada) Mulsant 1850; Ladoria Mulsant 1850

Genus of beetles

Mada is a genus of beetles in the family Coccinellidae.

== Species ==
- Mada adusta
- Mada amapa
- Mada amplexata
- Mada amydra
- Mada andeana
- Mada apada
- Mada azyoides
- Mada bechynei
- Mada brasilia
- Mada camargoi
- Mada cayennensis
- Mada circumflua
- Mada circumducta
- Mada concentrica
- Mada contempta
- Mada dentata
- Mada desarmata
- Mada deyrollei
- Mada dissita
- Mada divaricata
- Mada elegans
- Mada flavomarginata
- Mada fraterna
- Mada germari
- Mada gounellei
- Mada hirsuta
- Mada indistincta
- Mada inepta
- Mada insolitaphallus
- Mada lineatopunctata
- Mada mourei
- Mada nexophallus
- Mada pichincha
- Mada polluta
- Mada pseudoapada
- Mada pseudodamata
- Mada pseudofraterna
- Mada rabauti
- Mada sanguinea
- Mada santaremae
- Mada simulatrix
- Mada spinula
- Mada synemia
- Mada virgata
- Mada zonula
