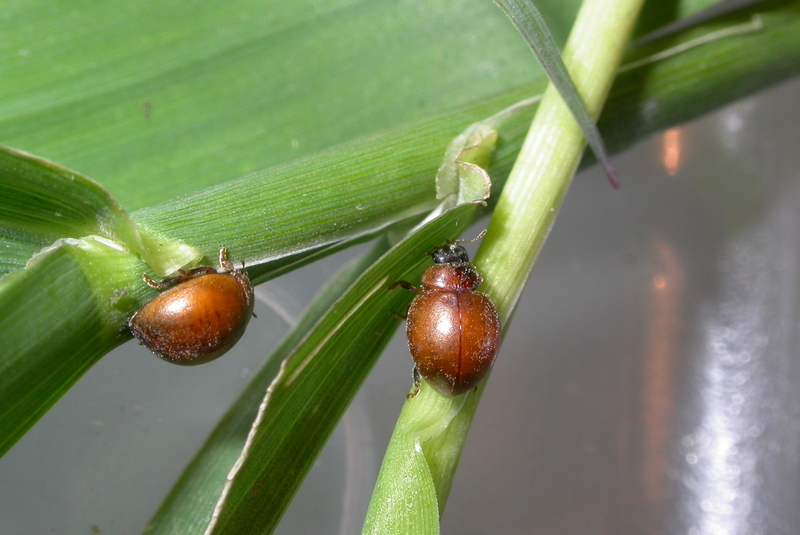
- Cynegetis impunctata

Scientific classification
- Kingdom: Animalia
- Phylum: Arthropoda
- Class: Insecta
- Order: Coleoptera
- Suborder: Polyphaga
- Infraorder: Cucujiformia
- Family: Coccinellidae
- Subfamily: Epilachninae
- Genus: Cynegetis; Chevrolat in Dejean, 1835

Species
- C. impunctata; C. syriaca

= Cynegetis =

Genus of beetles

Cynegetis is a genus of Coccinellidae native to Eurasia. The genus was first established by Louis Alexandre Auguste Chevrolat in 1835, and contains only three species.

== Species ==
Cynegetis contains three species:

- Cynegetis impunctata Linnaeus, 1958
- Cynegetis syriaca Mader, 1958
- Cynegetis chinensis Wang and Ren, 2014

== Description ==
The species in the Cynegetis genus have oval and strongly convex bodies, well-developed spurs on all tibiae, and similar male and female genitalia. These descriptions are similar to the Subcoccinella genus and are also similar in their larvae, which have similar shapes and armatures of their body walls.

== Distribution ==
The genus is distributed in the Palaearctic region. In Europe, countries of occurrence include Austria, Belgium, Bosnia and Herzegovina, Czech Republic, Denmark, Finland, France, Germany, Hungary, Italy, Norway, Poland, Romania, Slovakia, Spain, Sweden, Switzerland, and Western Russia. In Asia, countries of occurrence include China (Ningxia), Eastern Russia (Maritime Province), Iran, North Korea, Syria, and Turkey.
