= Mada deyrollei =

Scientific classification
- Kingdom: Animalia
- Phylum: Arthropoda
- Class: Insecta
- Order: Coleoptera
- Suborder: Polyphaga
- Infraorder: Cucujiformia
- Family: Coccinellidae
- Genus: Mada
- Species: M. deyrollei

Binomial name
- Mada deyrollei Gordon, 1975

Species of beetle

Mada deyrollei is a species of beetle of the family Coccinellidae. It is found in Brazil.

== Description ==
Adults reach a length of about 3.48 mm. Adults are brownish yellow, while the posterior half of the head is brownish piceous. The pronotum is brownish piceous, with the anterolateral angle brownish yellow. The elytron is brownish piceous with a bluish tinge and a paler lateral margin.
