= Pseudodira =

Scientific classification
- Missing taxonomy template (fix): Pseudodira

Genus of beetles

Pseudodira is a genus of beetles in the family Coccinellidae.

== Species ==
- Pseudodira amazona Szawaryn, 2015
- Pseudodira carmelitana (Mulsant, 1853)
- Pseudodira clypealis Gordon, 1975
