= Twenty eight-spotted potato ladybird =

Twenty eight-spotted potato ladybird is a common name for several beetles and may refer to:

- Henosepilachna vigintioctomaculata
- Henosepilachna vigintioctopunctata
