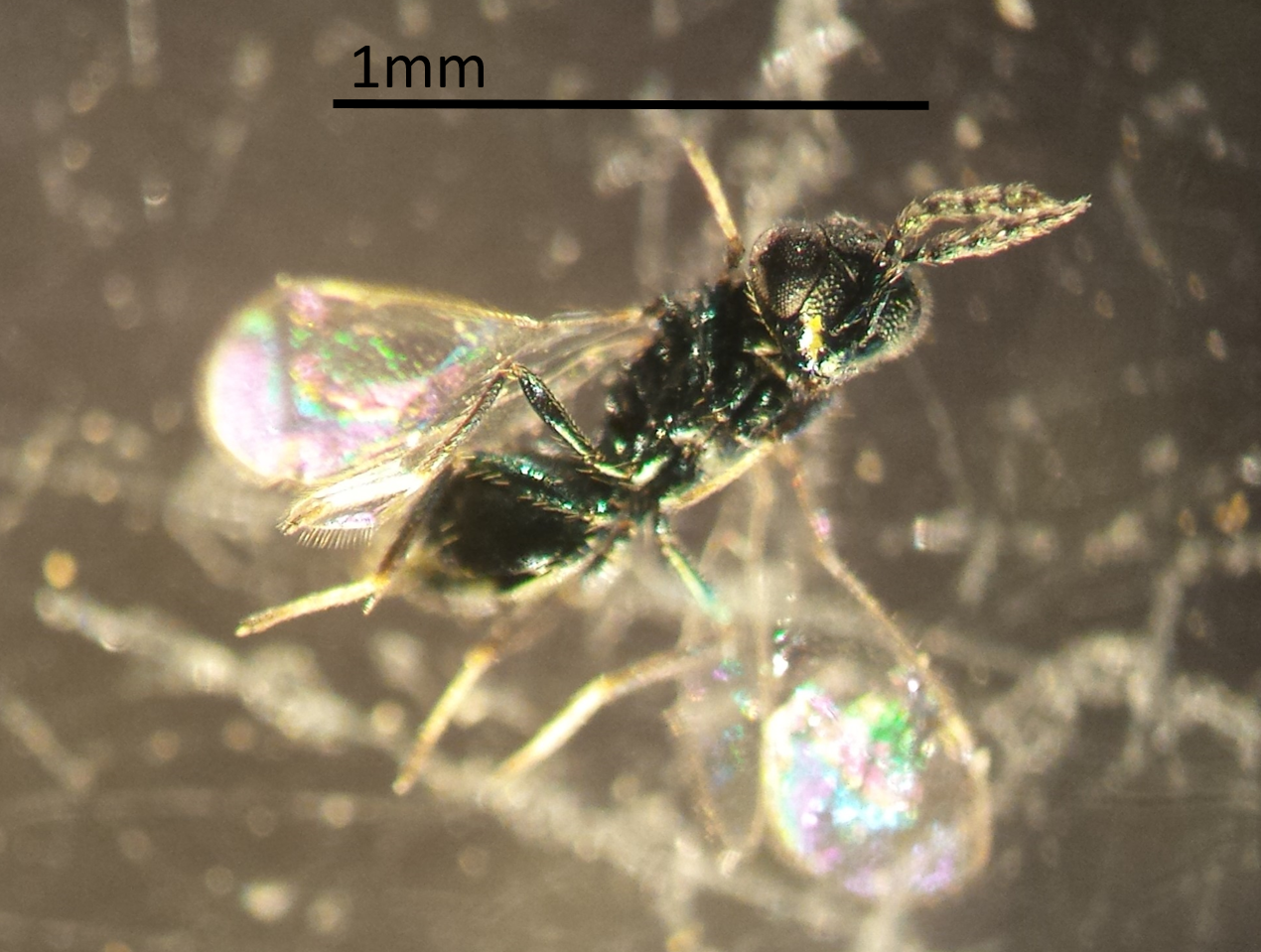
- Pediobius foveolatus adult wasp
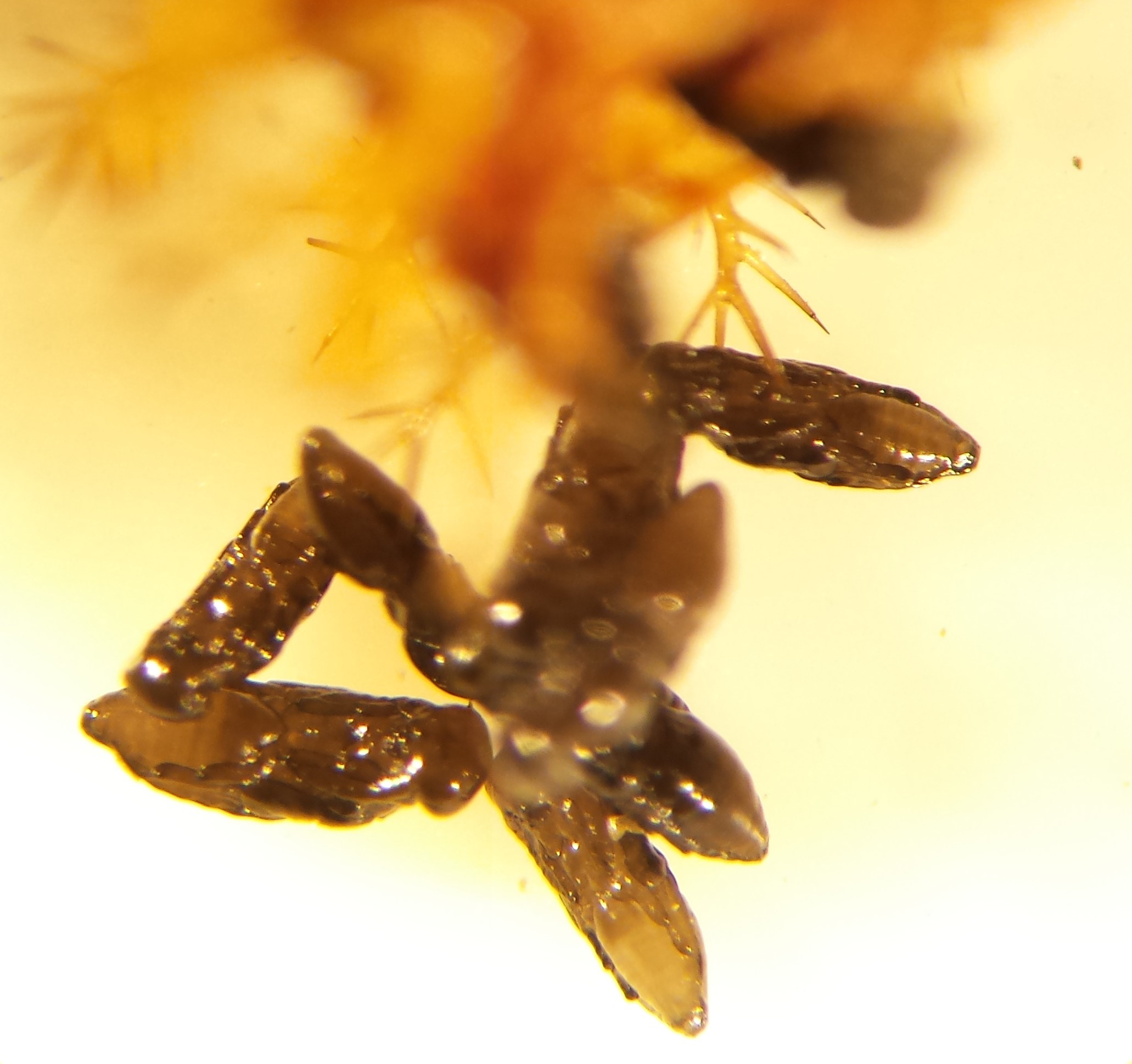
- Pediobius foveolatus pupae from Mexican bean beetle mummy

Scientific classification
- Domain: Eukaryota
- Kingdom: Animalia
- Phylum: Arthropoda
- Class: Insecta
- Order: Hymenoptera
- Family: Eulophidae
- Genus: Pediobius
- Species: P. foveolatus

Binomial name
- Pediobius foveolatus Crawford, 1912

Synonyms
- Mestocharis lividus Girault, 1913; Mestocharomyia lividus (Girault, 1913); Pediobius epilachnae (Rohwer, 1921); Pediobius mediopunctata (Waterston, 1915); Pediobius mediopunctatus (Waterston, 1915); Pediobius simiolus (Takahashi, 1932); Pleurotropis epilachnae Rohwer, 1921; Pleurotropis foveolatus Crawford, 1912; Pleurotropis mediopunctata Waterston, 1915; Pleurotropis simiolus Takahashi, 1932

= Pediobius foveolatus =

Species of wasp

Pediobius foveolatus (Crawford) (Fig. 1 and 3), is a tiny exotic parasitoid wasp that is used for biological control of Mexican bean beetle, Epilachna varivestis (Fig. 2), an important insect pest of snap beans, lima beans, and sometimes soybeans mainly found at economic levels in the eastern United States. Pediobius foveolatus is in the family Eulophidae, and is the most successful biological control agent for Mexican bean beetle. This wasp only attacks beetle larvae, not eggs or adults. It is commonly used by smaller, organic growers; but is also mass released throughout the state of New Jersey, by their state department of agriculture.

Pediobius foveolatus was discovered in India, and is native to most of southern Asia and Japan, where it attacks a regional epilachnine crop pest, Henosepilachna vigintioctopunctata. In its native range, Pediobius foveolatus either overwinters in host larvae, or not at all due to the lack of a cold season. In the United States, however, Pediobius foveolatus cannot survive cold winter months because all North American hosts (Mexican bean beetle and Squash beetle, Epilachna borealis) overwinter as adults, not larvae. Therefore, P. foveolatus wasps die off each winter, and must be released annually in order to provide ongoing control of host beetles in the United States. Wasps are mass produced by, and can be purchased from, the New Jersey Department of Agriculture and other commercial insectaries.

Female Pediobius foveolatus lay around 20 eggs in a single beetle larva, and the wasp larvae hatch within the beetle larva, and begin to feed. This eventually kills the beetle larva, causing it eventually turn brown. The dead, brown beetle larva is called a "mummy"). Adult wasps emerge from the larvae after about 15 days, mate, and search for more beetle larvae to parasitize. Pediobius foveolatus wasps will also parasitize the larvae of squash beetle, Epilachna borealis, a closely related species that feeds on cucurbit crops. Pediobius foveolatus are extremely small, about 1-2mm long, and will not harm humans, beneficial insects, or any organisms outside the beetle genus Epilachna and its close relatives.

== Biological control ==
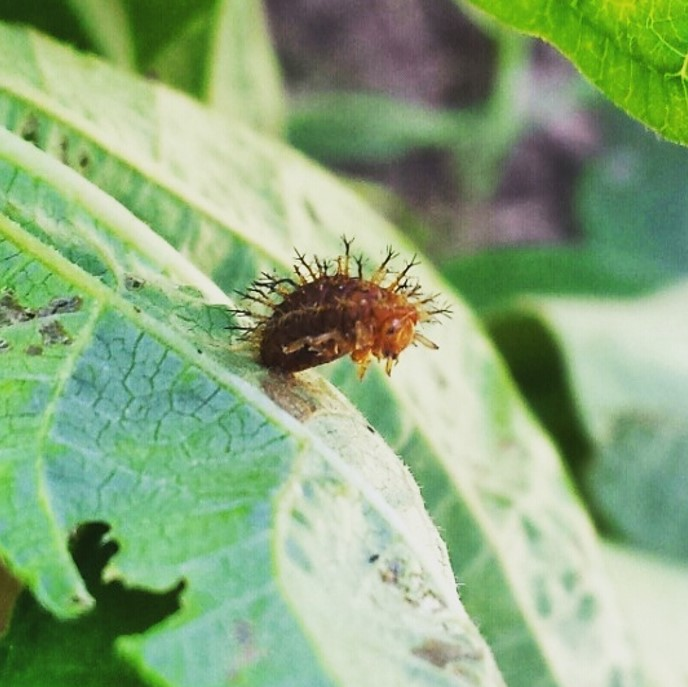
Mexican bean beetle "Mummy" (larva parasitized by Pediobius foveolatus)

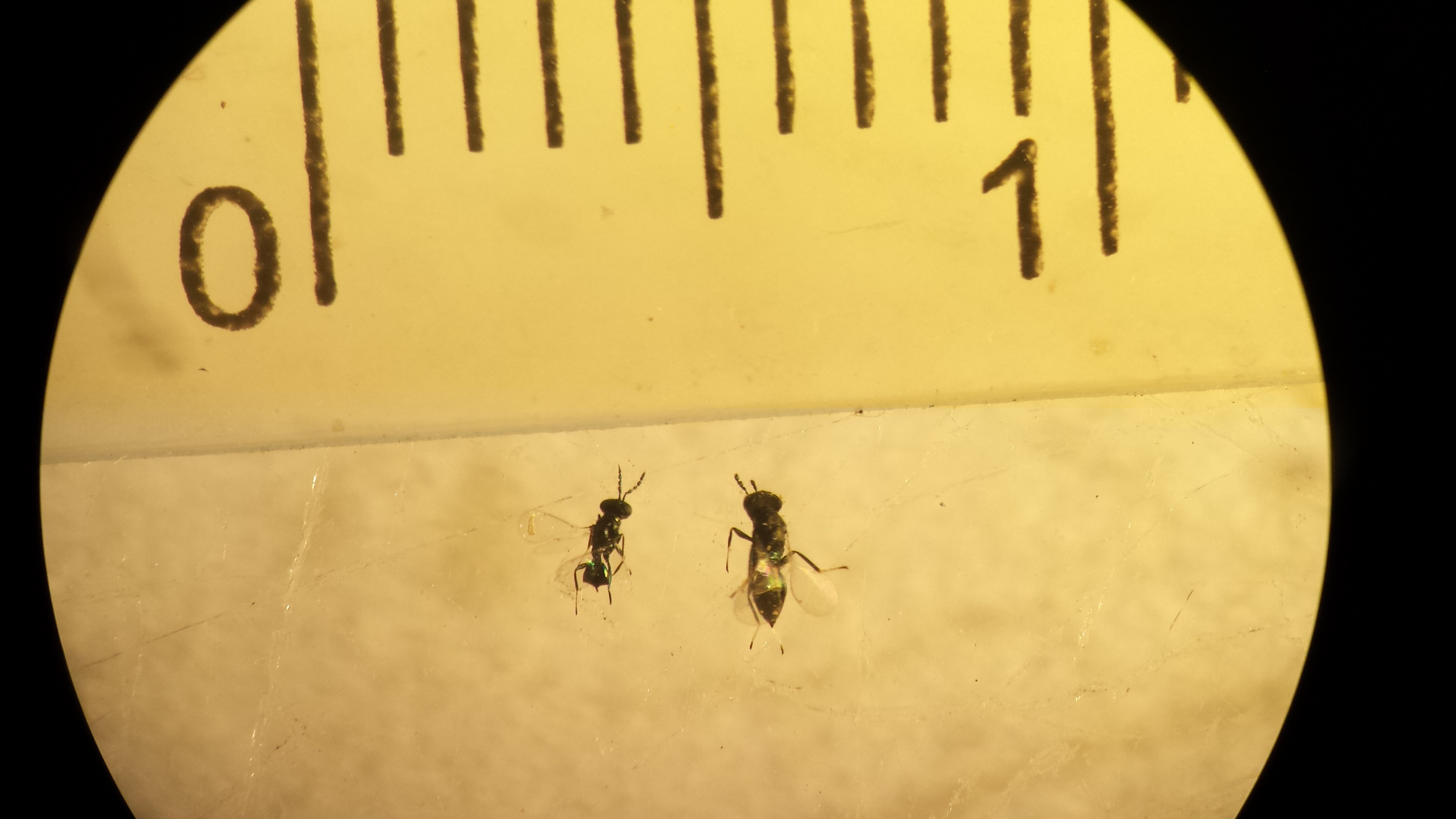
Pediobius foveolatus wasps

Managing Mexican bean beetle using Pediobius foveolatus can be difficult due to its sensitivity to cool, wet weather, and the need for a release date to line up with the phenology of Mexican bean beetle larvae. Ideally, P. foveolatus is released at both one and two weeks after first instar Mexican bean beetle larvae are discovered in beans. Pediobius foveolatus reproduce most successfully within the older and larger beetle larvae; if older, larger Mexican bean beetle instars are present when P. foveolatus is released, they will be without a host. Pediobius foveolatus is also sensitive to cold and wet weather, and are unlike to survive when released in these conditions. Wasps are generally released rate of 1000 wasps (or 50 mummies) per 3600 square feet of beans. Successful parasitism and emergence of the next generation of wasps is visibly monitored by the presence of dark-brown, dead Mexican bean beetle larvae (“mummies”). Mummies exhibit one small hole from which adult P. foveolatus have exited.

== History of Pediobius foveolatus in the United States ==
Beginning in 1966, Pediobius foveolatus was imported to the United States to be tested for potential control of Mexican bean beetle. Initial testing determined that P. foveolatus would readily parasitize the larvae of Mexican bean beetle, while leaving native, predatory coccinellids unharmed. In 1972, Maryland, then other states, began releasing P. foveolatus to control Mexican bean beetle. USDA branches in New Jersey, Maryland, Delaware and Virginia released wasps throughout these states, focusing on areas with large soybean acreage and high Mexican bean beetle populations.

Inoculative releases of Pediobius foveolatus yielded positive results; parasitism rates of 80 to 100% of Mexican bean beetle larvae were commonly documented near release sites. However, Steven et al. (1975) also reported slow population dispersal from these sites. Also, P. foveolatus cannot overwinter in the United States due to cold winters and the lack of an overwintering host. In P. foveolatus native territory, the weather either is conducive for year-round exposure, or wasps overwinter in their hosts, which overwinter as larvae. Because Mexican bean beetle overwinter as adults, wasps are without adequate winter refuge in the United States. Because P. foveolatus can neither overwinter successfully nor spread rapidly, management with this wasp requires yearly releases in more locations than is practical to control of Mexican bean beetle on a large scale. By the mid-1980s, all states except New Jersey had discontinued state-run releases. At this time, pest pressure from Mexican bean beetle began its sharp decline as well, especially in soybean.
