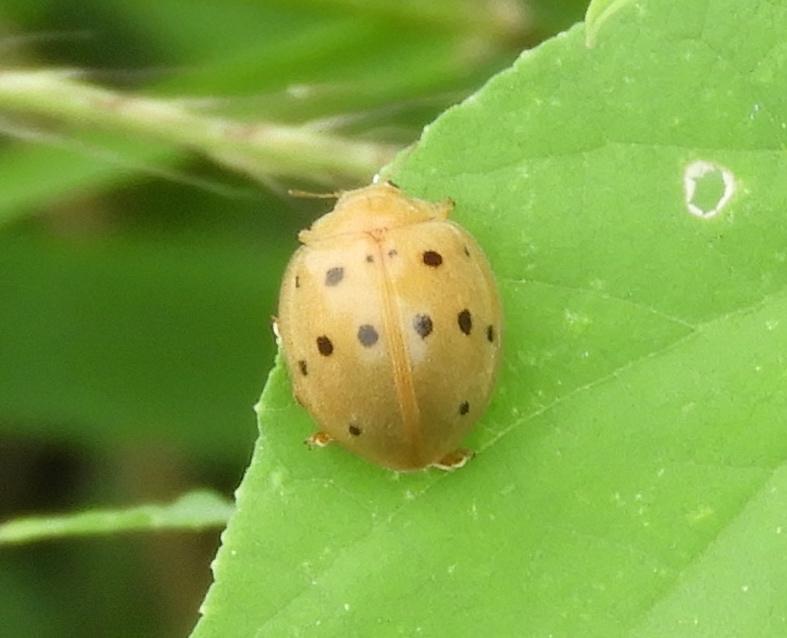

Scientific classification
- Kingdom: Animalia
- Phylum: Arthropoda
- Clade: Pancrustacea
- Class: Insecta
- Order: Coleoptera
- Suborder: Polyphaga
- Infraorder: Cucujiformia
- Family: Coccinellidae
- Genus: Epilachna
- Species: E. tredecimnotata

Binomial name
- Epilachna tredecimnotata (Latreille, 1833)

Synonyms
- Coccinella tredecimnotata Latreille, 1833; Coccinella immaculicollis Chevrolat, 1833; Epilachna particollis Mulsant, 1850; Epilachna aequinoxialis Mulsant, 1850; Epilachna indiscreta Mulsant, 1853; Epilachna simillima Crotch, 1874; Epilachna picescens Gorham, 1899

= Epilachna tredecimnotata =

Species of beetle

Epilachna tredecimnotata, the southern squash lady beetle, is a species of plant-eating lady beetle in the family Coccinellidae. It is found in the Caribbean Sea, Central America, South America, and North America (western Texas to Arizona).

== Description ==
Adults reach a length of about 6.75–10 mm. Adults are similar to Epilachna borealis, but the spots on the elytron are smaller.
