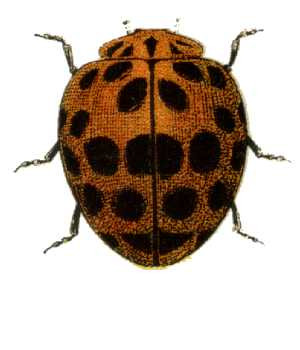

Scientific classification
- Domain: Eukaryota
- Kingdom: Animalia
- Phylum: Arthropoda
- Class: Insecta
- Order: Coleoptera
- Suborder: Polyphaga
- Infraorder: Cucujiformia
- Family: Coccinellidae
- Genus: Henosepilachna
- Species: H. vigintisexpunctata

Binomial name
- Henosepilachna vigintisexpunctata (Boisduval, 1835)

Synonyms
- Coccinella vigintisexpunctata Boisduval, 1835; Coccinella doryca Boisduval, 1835; Epilachna doryca Auctt. Epilachna doryca erimensis Weise, 1902; Epilachna philippinensis Dieke, 1947; Epilachna philippinensis australica Dieke, 1947; Epilachna vigintisexpunctata Auctt. Epilachna doryca australica Auctt. Epilachna doryca philippinensis Auctt. Henosepilachna doryca Auctt. Henosepilachna philippinensis Auctt.

= Henosepilachna vigintisexpunctata =

Species of beetle

Henosepilachna vigintisexpunctata, common name twenty-six-spotted potato ladybird, is a ladybird species.
