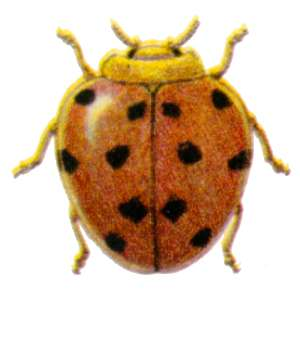

Scientific classification
- Domain: Eukaryota
- Kingdom: Animalia
- Phylum: Arthropoda
- Class: Insecta
- Order: Coleoptera
- Suborder: Polyphaga
- Infraorder: Cucujiformia
- Family: Coccinellidae
- Genus: Henosepilachna
- Species: H. sumbana

Binomial name
- Henosepilachna sumbana (Bielawski, 1959)

Synonyms
- Epilachna vigintioctopunctata sumbana Bielawski, 1959; Epilachna cucurbitae Richards, 1983; Henosepilachna cucurbitae (Richards, 1983)

= Henosepilachna sumbana =

Species of beetle

Henosepilachna sumbana, known commonly as the cucurbit ladybird, and sometimes listed as Henosepilachna cucurbitae is a pest ladybird species. H. sumbana feeds on cucurbits; vine-growing fruits such as melons, pumpkins, gourds, and cucumbers.
