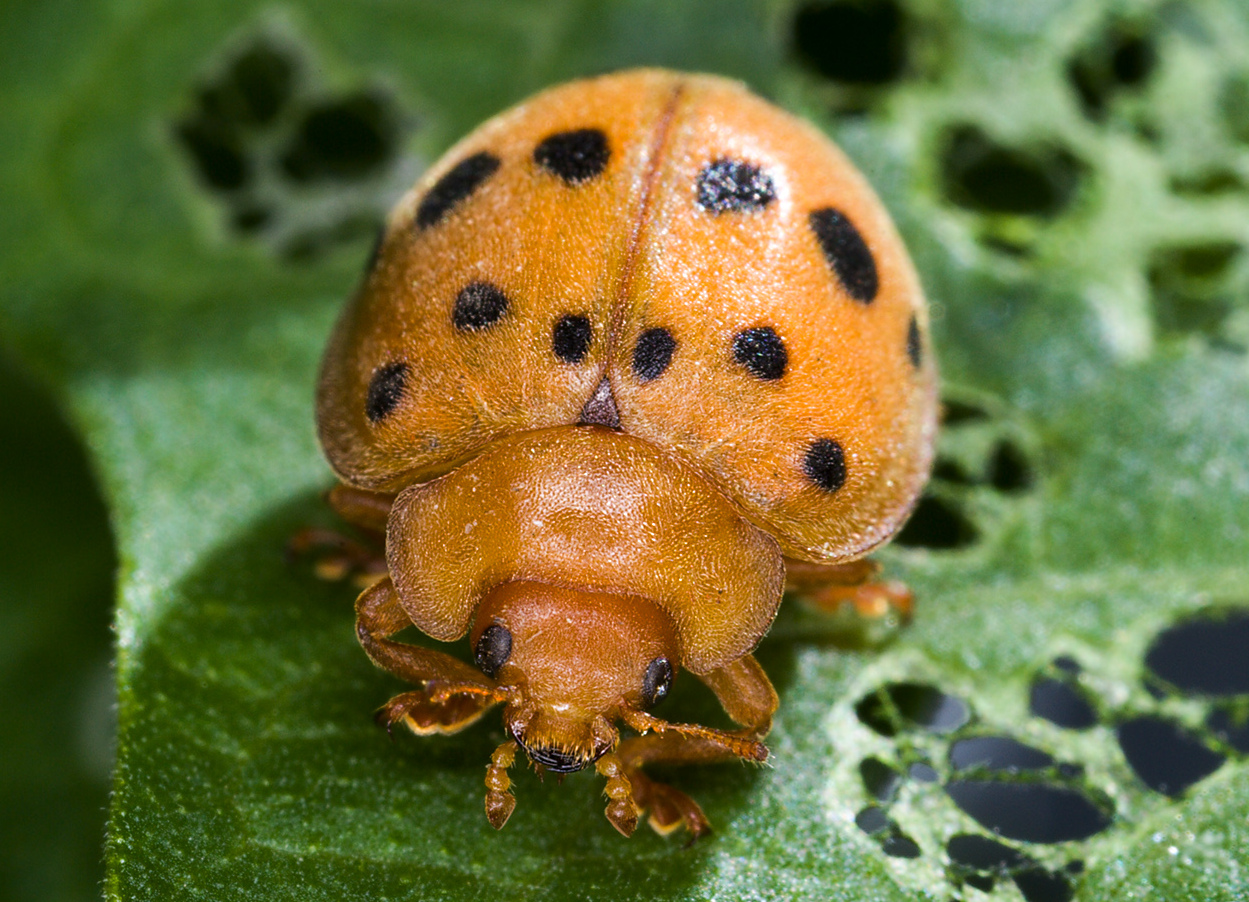

Scientific classification
- Domain: Eukaryota
- Kingdom: Animalia
- Phylum: Arthropoda
- Class: Insecta
- Order: Coleoptera
- Suborder: Polyphaga
- Infraorder: Cucujiformia
- Family: Coccinellidae
- Genus: Epilachna
- Species: E. varivestis

Binomial name
- Epilachna varivestis Mulsant, 1850

Synonyms
- Epilachna cervina Mulsant, 1850; Epilachna corrupta Mulsant, 1850; Epilachna cuprea Cockerell, 1918; Epilachna genuina Mulsant, 1850; Epilachna juncta Johnson, 1910; Epilachna maculiventris Bland, 1864; Epilachna toweri Johnson, 1910

= Mexican bean beetle =

Species of beetle

The Mexican bean beetle (Epilachna varivestis) is a species of lady beetle that can be an agricultural pest. It is one of the few North American lady beetles that feed on plants rather than other insects. It is found throughout Mexico and the eastern United States, and is abundant in the wetter and more heavily irrigated areas west of the Rocky Mountains. It does not tolerate extremely dry areas.

== Identification ==
Adults are similar in appearance to other lady beetles, oval-shaped, approximately 6 to 7 millimeters long and bearing eight black spots on each elytron. Adult color is quite variable, ranging from bright red to rusty brown to golden yellow. The eggs are yellow, about 1.3 millimeters in length, and glued in clusters of up to 75 on the undersides of leaves. The larvae are usually yellow, spiny, and pill-shaped. Each is approximately 1.6 millimeters in length when first emerged, and grows to about centimeter length before pupation.

== Distribution ==
Mexican bean beetle is present in the United States and found in most eastern states of the United States and Mexico. It can be found as far south as Guatemala and north into southern Canada or New England. The Mexican bean beetle is likely native to the southern plateau region of Mexico. Presence depends on the factors such as precipitation. It does not cause significant crop damage in Guatemala and Mexico, but can be abundant in isolated areas of the western United States.

== Feeding ==
Both adults and larvae feed on leaf, flower, or pod tissue on beans and other legumes. They can be found on a great variety of bean and crop plants, including green bean, thicket bean, lima bean, cowpeas, adzuki bean, mung bean, and soybean. It will also attack other legumes (such as alfalfa and various clovers), including some ornamentals, such as Chinese wisteria and lupines. Adult beetles may eat the fruits and flowers of the plants, but generally prefer the leaves. Feeding damage is most prevalent from skeletonization where beetles feed on the parenchyma of the leaves from the underside, leaving the upper epidermis intact. This gives the leaf a lacy appearance. The larvae generally do much more damage than the adults.

== Life cycle ==
Adults emerge from dormancy in late spring, and each female lays several hundred eggs in clusters of 50 to 75 on bean plant leaves. The larvae are voracious feeders, and can inflict heavy damage on a field of bean plants during an infestation. After a few weeks of feeding, the larvae pupate in groups under the leaves. They winter as adults, and often travel long distances to find new fields.

== Control ==
The parasitoid wasp Pediobius foveolatus can be used as augmentative biological control against the Mexican bean beetle.

Systemic insecticides are commonly used at planting where Mexican bean beetle is a frequent pest. Some of these insecticides do not persist in the plant long enough to protect the plant from early generations. Delayed planting or a trap crop can reduce the likelihood of significant populations.
