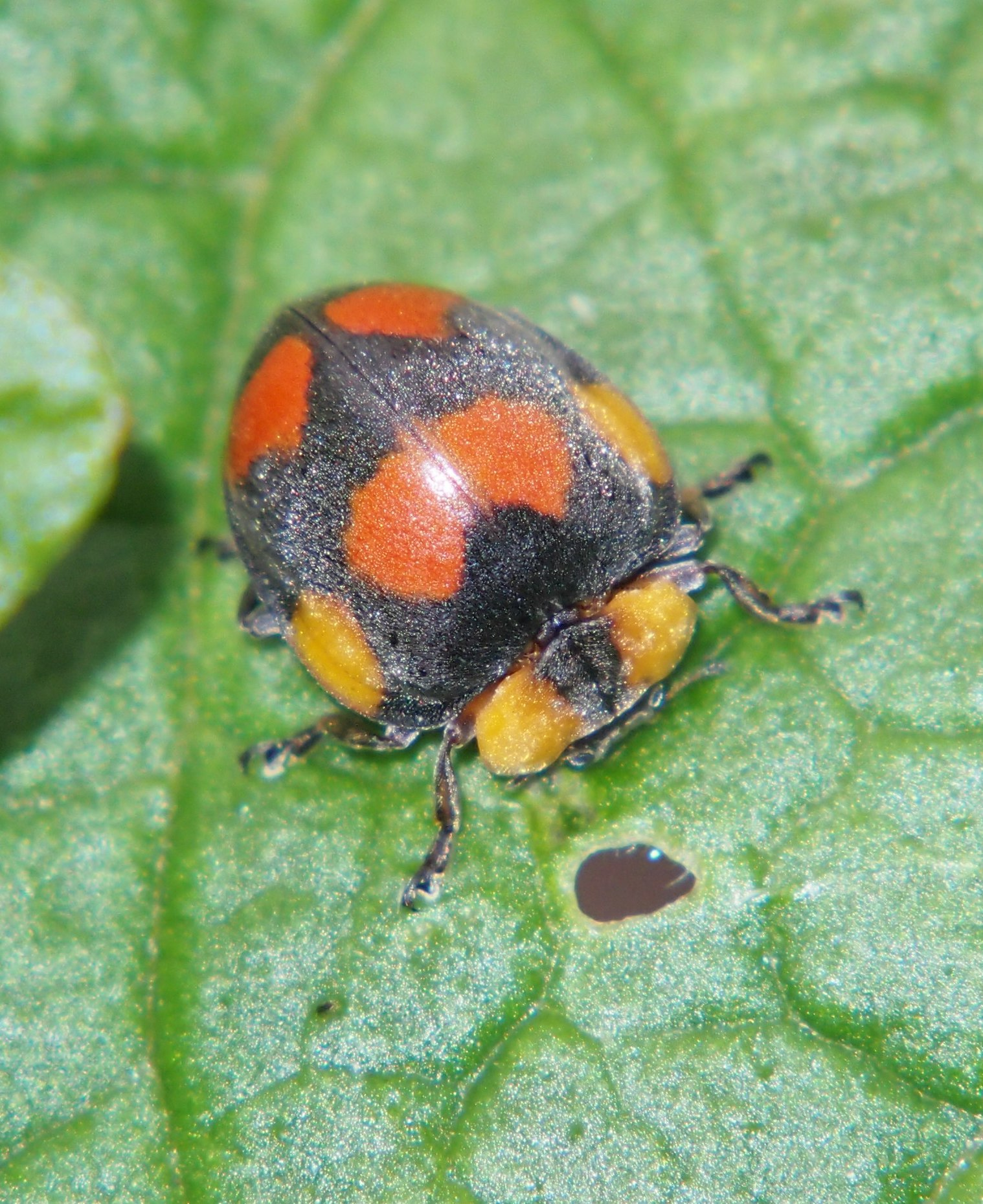

Scientific classification
- Kingdom: Animalia
- Phylum: Arthropoda
- Class: Insecta
- Order: Coleoptera
- Suborder: Polyphaga
- Infraorder: Cucujiformia
- Family: Coccinellidae
- Genus: Papuaepilachna
- Species: P. guttatopustulata

Binomial name
- Papuaepilachna guttatopustulata Fabricius, 1775

Synonyms
- Henosepilachna guttatopustulata

= Papuaepilachna guttatopustulata =

Species of beetle

Papuaepilachna guttatopustulata, the large leaf-eating ladybird, is a species of ladybird, formerly in the genus Henosepilachna endemic to parts of Australasia, specifically New South Wales, Queensland, the Bismarck Archipelago, New Guinea, New Hebrides and Solomon Islands.

Papuaepilachna guttatopustulata is a member of the subfamily Epilachninae. Accordingly it is herbivorous; both the larvae and the adults eat the foliage of solanaceous plants. In addition to feeding on native species and on introduced weeds such as Solanum nigrum, it attacks cultivated plants such as Duboisia spp., egg plant, potato and tomato.

The species causes further damage by acting as a vector for Solanum nodiflorum mottle virus.

Papuaepilachna guttatopustulata is the host for the parasitic chalcid wasp Uga colliscutellum.

== Description ==
Papuaepilachna guttatopustulata is 7–9 mm in length, with the distinct rounded elytra or fore wings typical of ladybirds. Apart from their coloured spots, the elytra and pronotum are black, while the propleura, the sides of the prothorax, are yellow or yellowish brown. Each elytron bears three spots. The spot on the top of the midline is reddish brown, as is the spot on the rear of the elytron. Another spot on the lower front part of the elytron also is yellow or yellowish brown.
