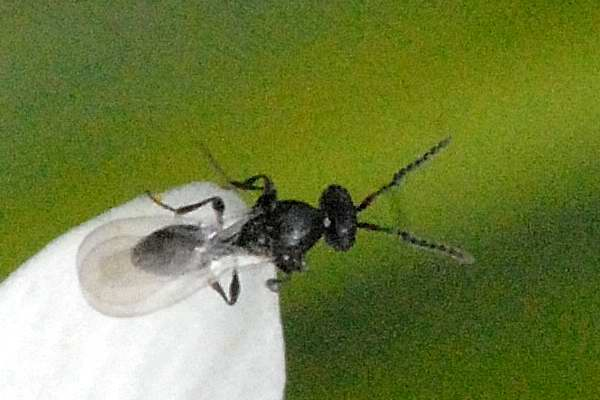
- Pediobius metallicus

Scientific classification
- Kingdom: Animalia
- Phylum: Arthropoda
- Clade: Pancrustacea
- Class: Insecta
- Order: Hymenoptera
- Family: Eulophidae
- Subfamily: Entedoninae
- Genus: Pediobius; Walker, 1846

Type species
- Pediobius imbreus (Walker, 1846)

Species
- See text

Synonyms
- Amestocharis Girault, 1913; Chrysoatomoides Girault, 1913; Cluthaira Cameron, 1912; Entedon (Pediobius) Walker, 1846; Entedonomyia Girault, 1915; Entedonopseus Girault, 1915; Epacrias Girault, 1913; Epipleurotropis Girault, 1917; Heptomerus Rondani, 1874; Horismenopsis Girault, 1915; Mesentedon Girault, 1920; Mestocharoideus Girault, 1913; Mestocharomyia Girault, 1915; Microterus Spinola, 1811; Neopseudacrias Girault, 1915; Pleurotropis Förster, 1856; Pseudacrias Girault, 1913; Pseudacriasoides Girault, 1917; Rhopalotus Förster, 1856; Spartiophilus Rondani, 1872

= Pediobius =

Genus of wasps

Pediobius is a genus of hymenopteran insects of the chalcid wasp family Eulophidae. Like their relatives, the larvae of these diminutive wasps are parasitoids of various arthropods (mainly insects). Some Pediobius are used in biological pest control.

There are over 200 species in the genus Pedobius and these include:

- Pediobius eubius (Walker, 1839)
- Pediobius foveolatus Crawford, 1912
- Pediobius imbreus (Walker, 1846)
- Pediobius lysis (Walker, 1839)
- Pediobius metallicus (Nees, 1834)
- Pediobius parvulus (Ferrière, 1933)
