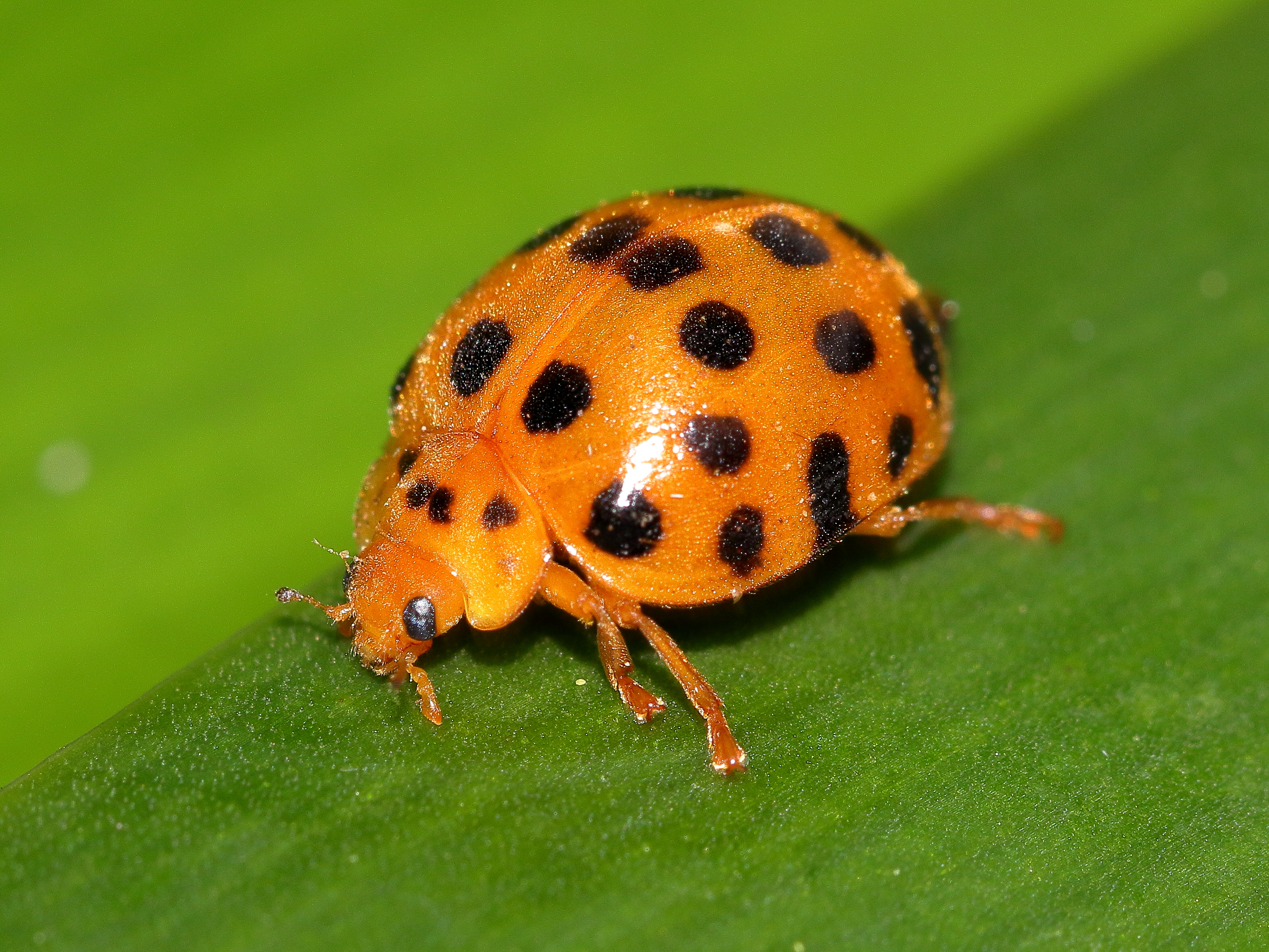
- Henosepilachna vigintioctopunctata

Scientific classification
- Kingdom: Animalia
- Phylum: Arthropoda
- Class: Insecta
- Order: Coleoptera
- Suborder: Polyphaga
- Infraorder: Cucujiformia
- Family: Coccinellidae
- Tribe: Epilachnini
- Genus: Henosepilachna; Li & Cook, 1961

Species
- ~20; See Text

Synonyms
- Subafissa Bielawski, 1963

= Henosepilachna =

Genus of beetles

Henosepilachna is a genus of beetle in the family Coccinellidae, including several pest species, such as the 28-spotted potato ladybird (which may refer to either Henosepilachna vigintioctomaculata, or Henosepilachna vigintioctopunctata).

== Distribution ==
Species in this genus occur through much of Asia and Australasia, and one species, Henosepilachna vigintioctopunctata, has been accidentally introduced in other parts of the world (e.g., Brazil and Argentina).

== Species ==
Henosepilachna adjuncta - Henosepilachna aduncfolia - Henosepilachna aegrota - Henosepilachna altera - Henosepilachna alternata - Henosepilachna ambitiosa - Henosepilachna amoena - Henosepilachna animanigra - Henosepilachna anita - Henosepilachna annulifera - Henosepilachna antinorii - Henosepilachna antiqua - Henosepilachna apicalis - Henosepilachna ardosiaca - Henosepilachna arenaria - Henosepilachna argus - Henosepilachna atra - Henosepilachna atropos - Henosepilachna auroguttata - Henosepilachna bacthaiensis - Henosepilachna baguiana - Henosepilachna bakeri - Henosepilachna balajuensis - Henosepilachna bielawskii - Henosepilachna bifasciata - Henosepilachna bipunctata - Henosepilachna bisdecemnotata - Henosepilachna bisquadrisignata - Henosepilachna bisseptemnotata - Henosepilachna blanchardi - Henosepilachna boisduvali - Henosepilachna bona - Henosepilachna brittoni - Henosepilachna buehleri - Henosepilachna callipepla - Henosepilachna capensis - Henosepilachna chamolika - Henosepilachna chenoni - Henosepilachna chirindica - Henosepilachna chromata - Henosepilachna circellaris - Henosepilachna clavareaui - Henosepilachna congoana - Henosepilachna congrex - Henosepilachna cruxaustralis - Henosepilachna cuprina - Henosepilachna curvisignata - Henosepilachna depauperata - Henosepilachna descarpentriesi - Henosepilachna diffinis - Henosepilachna discreta - Henosepilachna diversa - Henosepilachna dodecastigma - Henosepilachna donendrina - Henosepilachna dubiosa - Henosepilachna duodecimguttata - Henosepilachna duodecimmaculata - Henosepilachna elongata - Henosepilachna enneasticta - Henosepilachna erlangeri - Henosepilachna ertli - Henosepilachna eudoxa - Henosepilachna extraordinaria - Henosepilachna fabriciana - Henosepilachna firma - Henosepilachna flavipalpis - Henosepilachna frusciantei - Henosepilachna fuerschi - Henosepilachna fulvosignata - Henosepilachna gangetica - Henosepilachna gemmifera - Henosepilachna genitalis - Henosepilachna gibba - Henosepilachna guineensis - Henosepilachna hades - Henosepilachna haematomelas - Henosepilachna haemorrhoa - Henosepilachna hanoiensis - Henosepilachna hauseri - Henosepilachna hemispherica - Henosepilachna hilaris - Henosepilachna hintzi - Henosepilachna hirtaeformis - Henosepilachna humerosa - Henosepilachna huonensis - Henosepilachna hypocrita - Henosepilachna implicata - Henosepilachna indica - Henosepilachna indistincta - Henosepilachna introgibbera - Henosepilachna johanna - Henosepilachna kabakovi - Henosepilachna kaesebergi - Henosepilachna kamoensis - Henosepilachna kampeni - Henosepilachna karenensis - Henosepilachna kaszabi - Henosepilachna kathmanduensis - Henosepilachna khasiensis - Henosepilachna kiboensis - Henosepilachna labyrinthica - Henosepilachna lanceolata - Henosepilachna laokayensis - Henosepilachna leucosticta - Henosepilachna libera - Henosepilachna loennbergi - Henosepilachna lucifera - Henosepilachna luteoguttata - Henosepilachna luzonica - Henosepilachna mafula - Henosepilachna mamitaka - Henosepilachna manipurensis - Henosepilachna maunsonica - Henosepilachna mediodentata - Henosepilachna meretricula - Henosepilachna mindanaonis - Henosepilachna mjoebergi - Henosepilachna morosa - Henosepilachna moseri - Henosepilachna mucronata - Henosepilachna musosaensis - Henosepilachna mutata - Henosepilachna nakanoi - Henosepilachna nana - Henosepilachna narayana - Henosepilachna natalensis - Henosepilachna nativitatis - Henosepilachna neumanni - Henosepilachna niaki - Henosepilachna novemmaculata - Henosepilachna nympha - Henosepilachna obliterata - Henosepilachna oceanica - Henosepilachna ocellata - Henosepilachna ohatra - Henosepilachna operculata - Henosepilachna ornata - Henosepilachna pagana - Henosepilachna papuensis - Henosepilachna parda - Henosepilachna perplexa - Henosepilachna peyrierasi - Henosepilachna popei - Henosepilachna processa - Henosepilachna pusillanima - Henosepilachna pustulosa - Henosepilachna pytharga - Henosepilachna pytho - Henosepilachna quadriguttata - Henosepilachna quadrioculata - Henosepilachna quadripartita - Henosepilachna quadriplagiata - Henosepilachna quarta - Henosepilachna quatuordecimsignata - Henosepilachna quinta - Henosepilachna raharizoninai - Henosepilachna randriamasyi - Henosepilachna reducta - Henosepilachna regina - Henosepilachna reticulata - Henosepilachna retigera - Henosepilachna rothschildi - Henosepilachna rudepunctata - Henosepilachna rudis - Henosepilachna rufociliata - Henosepilachna ruvenzorica - Henosepilachna satanas - Henosepilachna scalaroides - Henosepilachna schultzei - Henosepilachna scutellaris - Henosepilachna sedecimverrucata - Henosepilachna septima - Henosepilachna sericata - Henosepilachna sexsignata - Henosepilachna sexta - Henosepilachna signatipennis - Henosepilachna sikkimica - Henosepilachna simplex - Henosepilachna singularis - Henosepilachna sobrina - Henosepilachna socialis - Henosepilachna sogai - Henosepilachna solomonensis - Henosepilachna soror - Henosepilachna stanleyi - Henosepilachna subfasciata - Henosepilachna subnigra - Henosepilachna suffusa - Henosepilachna sumatrensis - Henosepilachna sumbana - Henosepilachna sutteri - Henosepilachna taeniata - Henosepilachna tahaka - Henosepilachna tamdaoensis - Henosepilachna tarda - Henosepilachna tenua - Henosepilachna tetragramma - Henosepilachna tonkinensis - Henosepilachna tremula - Henosepilachna tricolorata - Henosepilachna triquetra - Henosepilachna tsara - Henosepilachna uenoi - Henosepilachna umbonata - Henosepilachna undecimsignata - Henosepilachna undecimvariolata - Henosepilachna unidentata - Henosepilachna urvillei - Henosepilachna verriculata - Henosepilachna versuta - Henosepilachna vicaria - Henosepilachna victoria - Henosepilachna viettei - Henosepilachna vigintioctomaculata - Henosepilachna vigintioctopunctata - Henosepilachna vigintisexpunctata - Henosepilachna vittula - Henosepilachna waerebekei - Henosepilachna wanati - Henosepilachna warchalowskii - Henosepilachna wissmanni - Henosepilachna yamuna - Henosepilachna yasutomii - Henosepilachna zebra Henosepilachna zenkeri

== Former species ==
Henosepilachna elaterii (Rossi) (now in Chnootriba)
Henosepilachna guttatopustulata (Fabricius) (now in Papuaepilachna)
