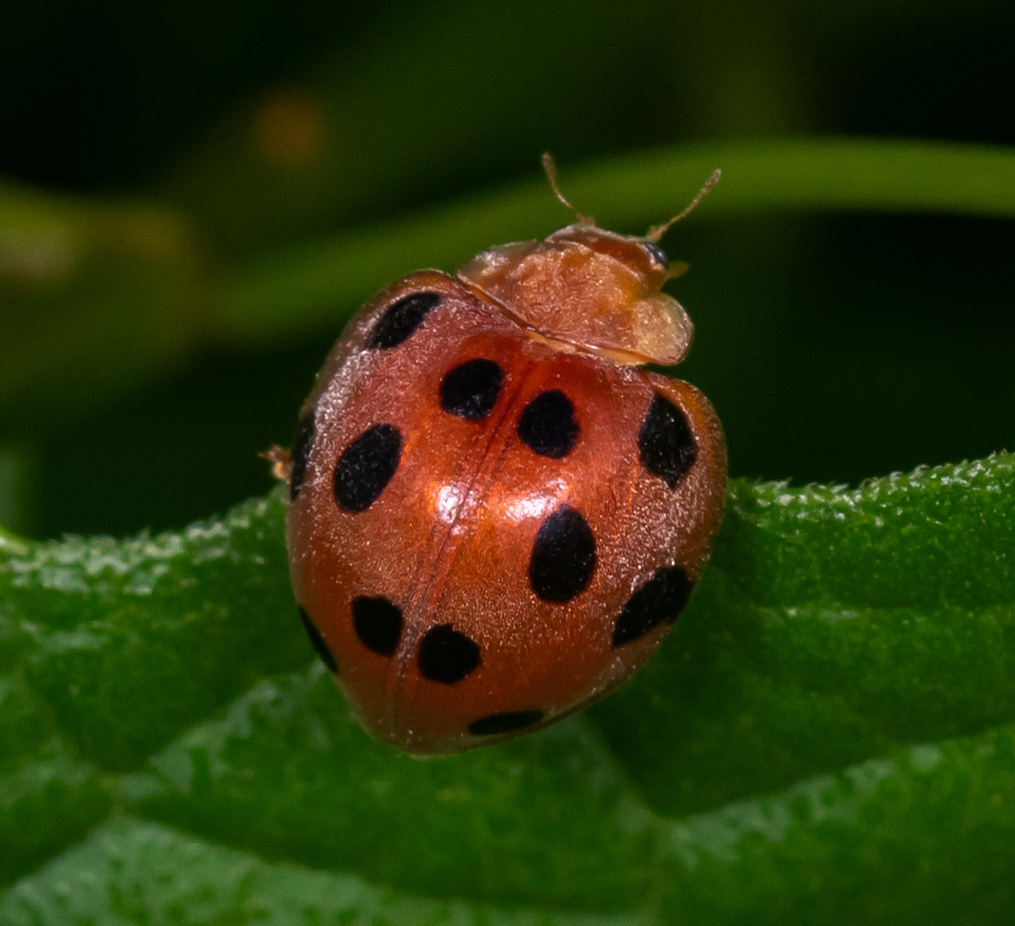

Scientific classification
- Kingdom: Animalia
- Phylum: Arthropoda
- Class: Insecta
- Order: Coleoptera
- Suborder: Polyphaga
- Infraorder: Cucujiformia
- Family: Coccinellidae
- Genus: Henosepilachna
- Species: H. pusillanima

Binomial name
- Henosepilachna pusillanima Mulsant, 1850

= Henosepilachna pusillanima =

Species of beetle

Henosepilachna pusillanima is a species of beetle in the family Coccinellidae. It is found in Taiwan, Indonesia, and the Philippines. Like others in the Henosepilachna genus, the species is herbivorous. It feeds primarily on plants in the family Solanaceae.

== Description ==
Henosepilachna pusillanima have an oval-shaped body with reddish-brown coloration and are covered in short white hairs. The pronotum is either spotless or has 4-8 fine black spots. Each elytron has six black spots, with the largest being the most posterior.
