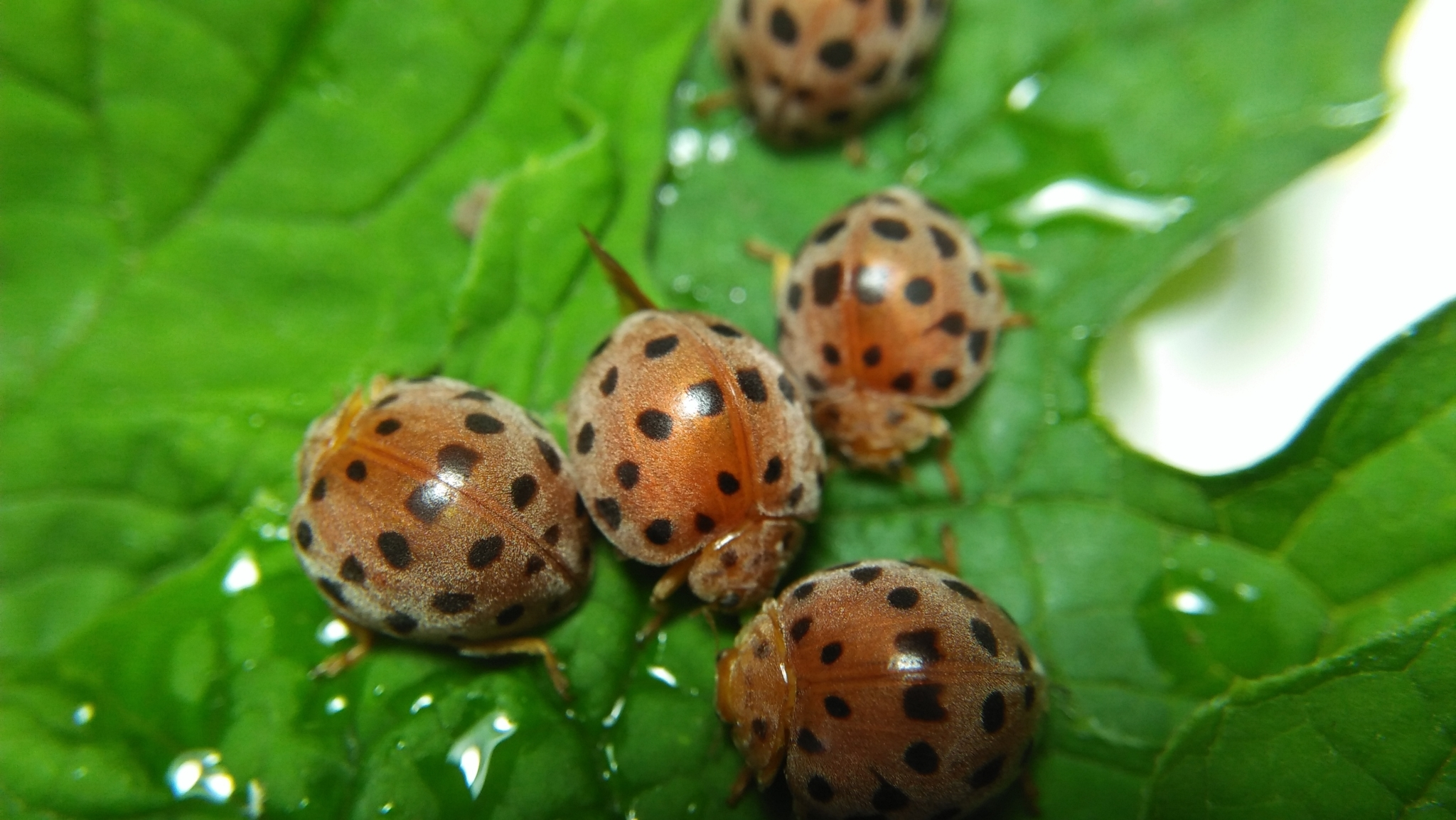

Scientific classification
- Kingdom: Animalia
- Phylum: Arthropoda
- Class: Insecta
- Order: Coleoptera
- Suborder: Polyphaga
- Infraorder: Cucujiformia
- Family: Coccinellidae
- Genus: Henosepilachna
- Species: H. septima

Binomial name
- Henosepilachna septima Dieke, 1947

Synonyms
- Epilachna keiseri Bielawiski, 1957; Epilachna septima (Dieke): Kapur, 1967; Henosepilachna septima (Dieke): Hoang, 1977

= Henosepilachna septima =

Species of beetle

Henosepilachna septima, is a species of lady beetle found in Vietnam, Indonesia, Malaysia, India, Sri Lanka and Pakistan.

== Description ==
Body length of male is about 6.62 mm and female is 7.44 mm. Body highly convex and yellowish red in color. Elytra consists mostly with 28 spots. Head lacks any spots. Pronotum mostly 2 and 6 spotted, but sometimes 4 and 7 spotted. The spot 7 is hazy. Elytral spot pattern variable. All the spots are away from suture and margin. Postcoxal line is complete and subterminal. In male genitalia, phalobase is trabe and basal piece is normal. Parameres are long, and thick without a distinct apical thorn, but covered with short hairs on apex. Siphonal tip is compressed.

== Biology ==
Adults are abundant during August and September. Adult female lays about 9 to 46 clusters of eggs. The incubation period varied from 4 to 6 days. Grub period is about 12 to 15 days, and pre-pupa is 1 to 2 days. The pupal period extends from 3 to 4 days, and the pre-ovipositional period is about 6 to 8 days. The total life cycle of the beetle is about 22 to 26 days, whereas the lifespan of adult is 16 to 25 days. A herbivorous ladybeetle, it is a serious pest of cucurbits where both grubs and adults feed throughout the crop stages and results in skeletonising the leaves. The recorded host plants are Momordica charantia, Luffa aegyptiaca, Luffa acutangula, Trichosanthes dioica and Trichosanthes cucumerina. The presence of grub indicates by scrapping nature of the epidermis, while semicircular cuts in rows, indicates the adults.
