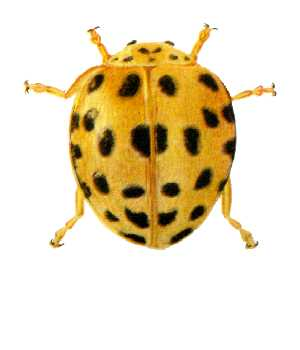

Scientific classification
- Domain: Eukaryota
- Kingdom: Animalia
- Phylum: Arthropoda
- Class: Insecta
- Order: Coleoptera
- Suborder: Polyphaga
- Infraorder: Cucujiformia
- Family: Coccinellidae
- Genus: Henosepilachna
- Species: H. vigintioctopunctata

Binomial name
- Henosepilachna vigintioctopunctata (Fabricius, 1775)

Synonyms
- Coccinella 28-punctata Fabricius, 1775; Coccinella sparsa Herbst, 1786; Epilachna gradaria Mulsant, 1850; Epilachna territa Mulsant, 1850; Epilachna vigintioctopunctata Auctt.; Epilachna sparsa Auctt.

= Henosepilachna vigintioctopunctata =

Species of beetle

Henosepilachna vigintioctopunctata is a species of beetle in the family Coccinellidae. It is commonly known as the 28-spotted potato ladybird or the Hadda beetle. It feeds on the foliage of potatoes and other solanaceous crops. It was previously called Epilachna vigintioctopunctata and is a cryptic species complex. It is very often confused with a closely related species, Henosepilachna vigintioctomaculata, which occurs in Russia, China, Japan, and Korea, and is given the same "common name".

== Seasonal abundance and natural enemies ==
Temperature and humidity strongly influence the seasonal abundance of this species; the population increases with increased minimum temperature, and higher relative humidity. However, this species has two natural enemies, Tetrastichus sp. and Pediobius foveolatus, that suppress the beetle population by parasitizing their larval and pupal stages.

== Distribution ==
This species is native to southeastern Asia, primarily India, but has been accidentally introduced to other parts of the world, including Australia and New Zealand. It has also been recorded from Brazil and Argentina, beginning in 1996.

== Economic significance ==
This species causes damage to agricultural crops primarily in the family Solanaceae, especially potatoes; other crops include pumpkin, turnips, radishes, beans and spinach.

== Gallery ==
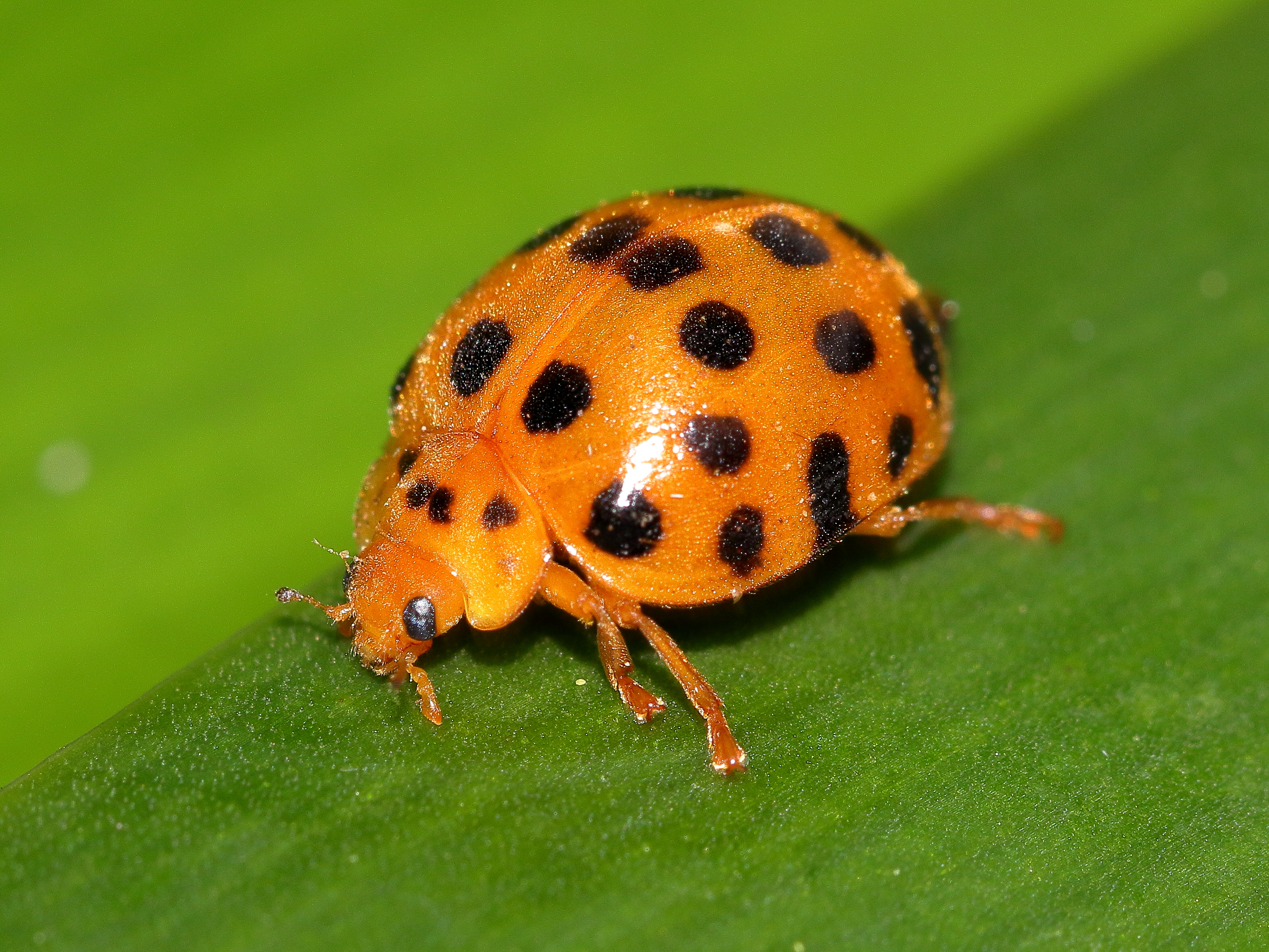
Potato ladybeetle (Cairns, Queensland)

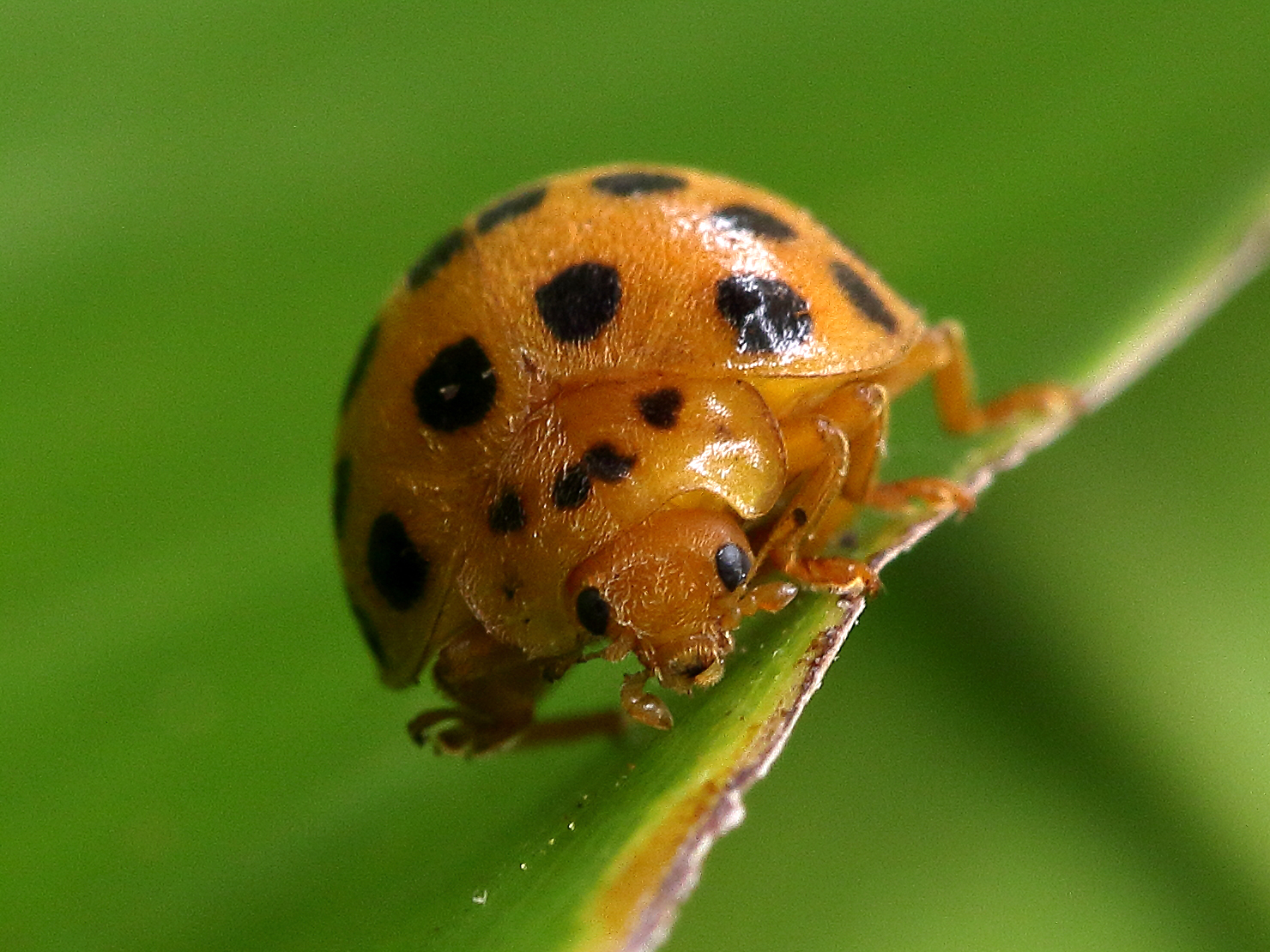
Head on view

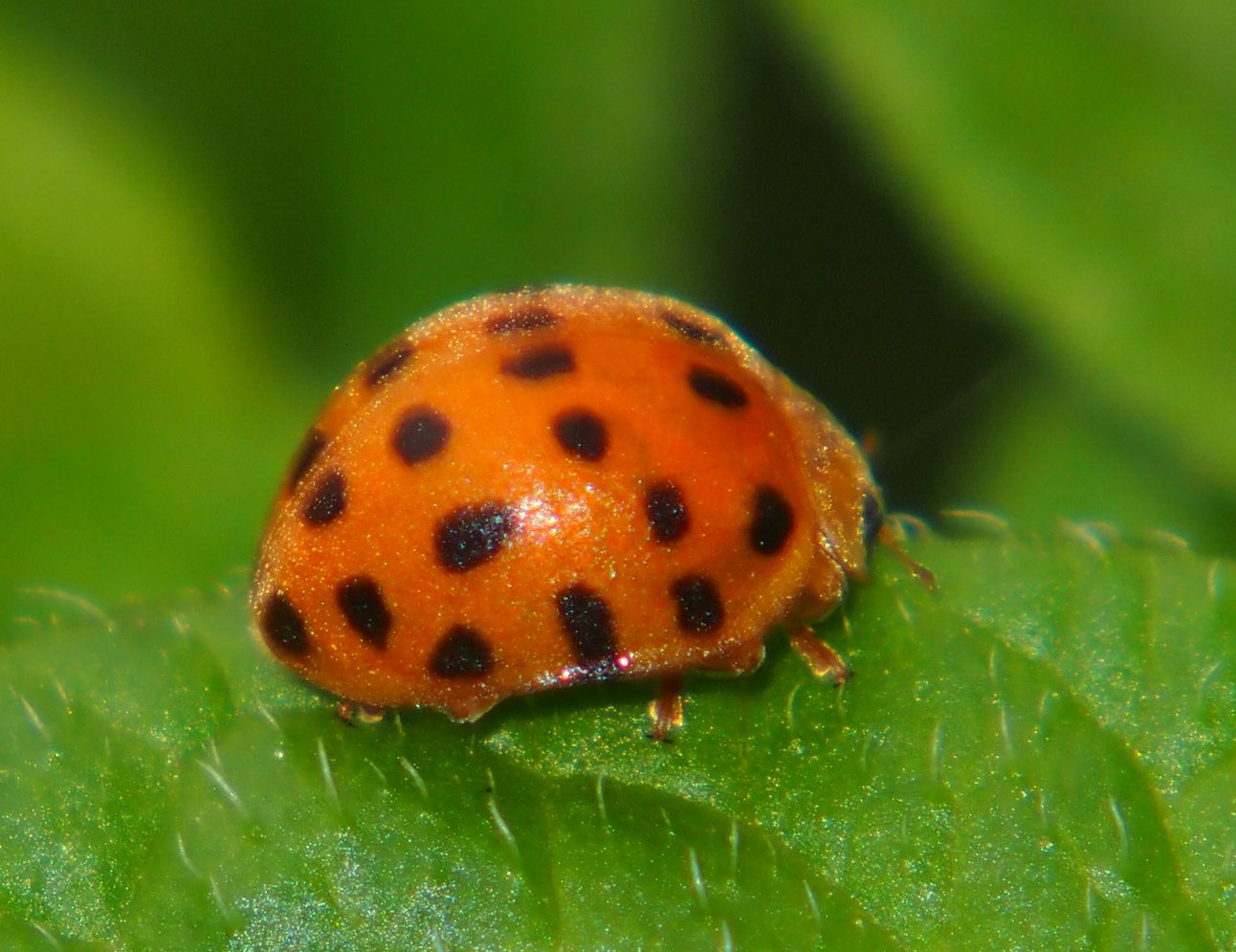
Rear view (different specimen)
