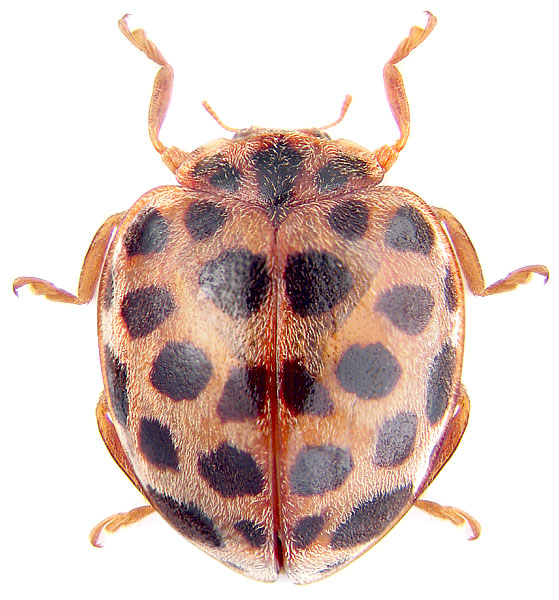

Scientific classification
- Kingdom: Animalia
- Phylum: Arthropoda
- Clade: Pancrustacea
- Class: Insecta
- Order: Coleoptera
- Suborder: Polyphaga
- Infraorder: Cucujiformia
- Family: Coccinellidae
- Genus: Henosepilachna
- Species: H. vigintioctomaculata

Binomial name
- Henosepilachna vigintioctomaculata (Motschulsky, 1857)

Synonyms
- Epilachna vigintioctomaculata

= Henosepilachna vigintioctomaculata =

Species of beetle

Henosepilachna vigintioctomaculata is a species of beetle in the family Coccinellidae. It is commonly known as the 28-spotted potato ladybird, a name also used for the closely related species, Henosepilachna vigintioctopunctata.

== Morphology and biology ==
The body of the 28-spotted potato ladybird is nearly round, convex, glossy and up to seven millimetres long. It is reddish-brown with thirteen black spots on each elytron and one or more on each side of the thorax. The eggs are yellow, about 1.5 millimetres long and are placed on the undersides of leaves in batches of ten to sixty five eggs. The oval larvae and pupae are yellow-green decorated with black branched thorny appendices. The beetles and larvae live openly on the leaves, eating the soft tissues between the veins. The female ladybird may produce 300 to 400 eggs. The development stages are completed in four to six weeks under optimal conditions. The larvae pupate on the leaves and young beetles of the new generation feed intensively for one to two weeks to build up their fatty tissue. Only adults are capable of over-wintering. They usually hibernate under fallen leaves at the edges of woods, in bushes or under plant residues in fields.

== Distribution ==
This species originated in the far east of Russia and has been expanding its range in the second half of the 20th century and is now found over most of Russia, north-east China, northern Korea and Japan.

== Economic significance ==
This species causes damage to agricultural crops in the three families Solanaceae (potato, tomato, aubergine and pepper), Cucurbitaceae (cucumber, melon, water-melon and pumpkin) and Fabaceae (soya and haricot beans). However the optimal host plant for the reproduction of over-wintered beetles and the development of their larvae is the potato. The loss in yield of potato tubers may reach 25% in heavy infestations. Control is by the use of resistant varieties of plants, crop rotation, the growing of solanaceous crops in open windy locations, the destruction of all plant residues and the use of pesticides when necessary.
