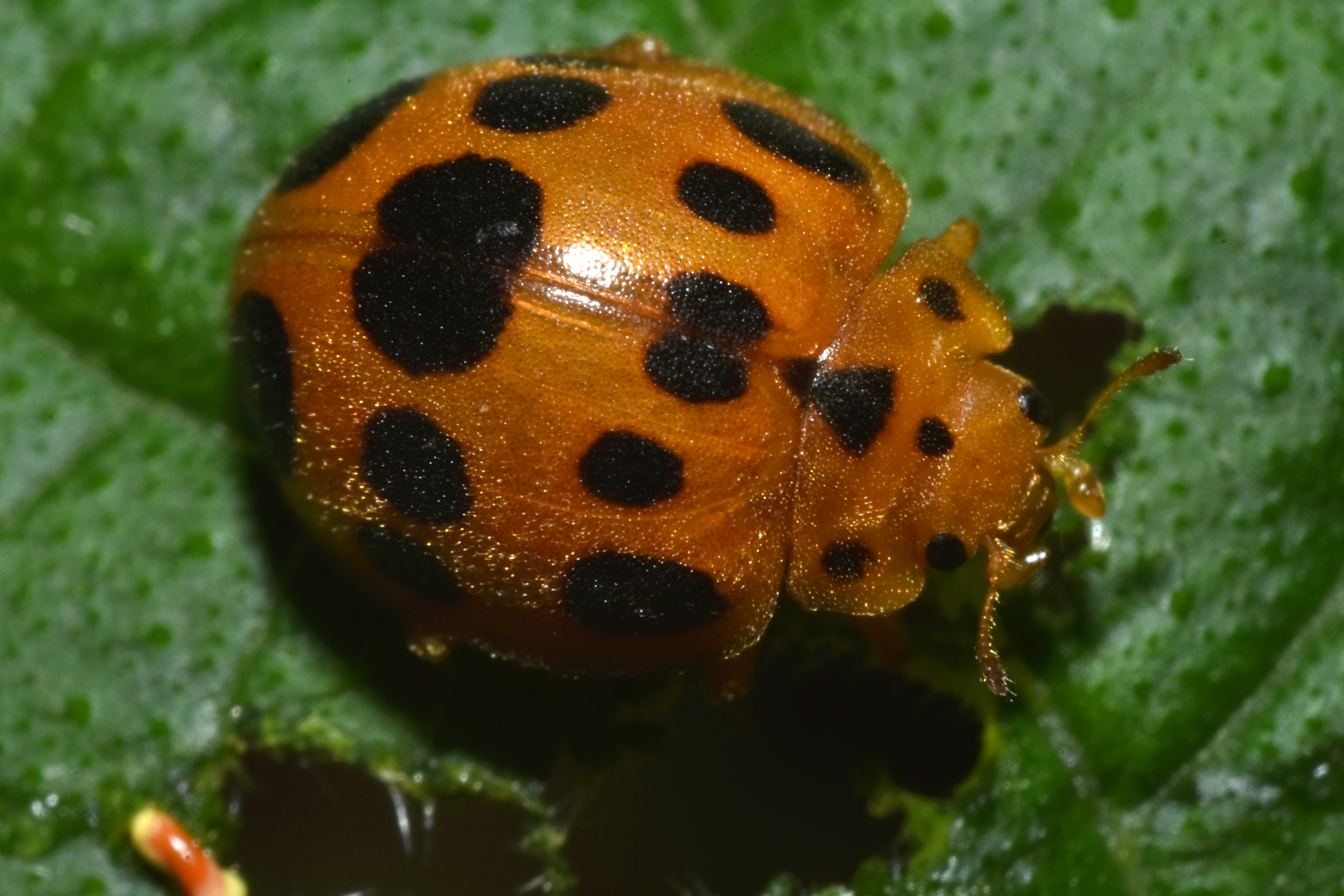

Scientific classification
- Kingdom: Animalia
- Phylum: Arthropoda
- Clade: Pancrustacea
- Class: Insecta
- Order: Coleoptera
- Suborder: Polyphaga
- Infraorder: Cucujiformia
- Family: Coccinellidae
- Genus: Epilachna
- Species: E. borealis

Binomial name
- Epilachna borealis (Fabricius, 1775)

Synonyms
- Coccinella borealis Fabricius, 1775

= Epilachna borealis =

Species of beetle

Epilachna borealis is a species of plant eating lady beetle that can commonly be found in the eastern United States. It is yellow with seven large black spots on each elytron and four small black spots on the pronotum. The species feeds on cucurbitaceous plants. Its common name is squash beetle. It is often mistaken for other types of ladybug or a cucumber beetle because of its similar appearance.

== Biology ==
The beetle lays a cluster of small yellow eggs on the leaf surfaces of cucurbitaceous plants. Both adult beetles and larvae feed on leaf tissue in between veins, and usually start by producing a semi-circle trench around their intended feeding area. Adult squash beetles can also be found feeding on the rind of pumpkins and squash later in the season.
